

236001–236100 

|-bgcolor=#d6d6d6
| 236001 ||  || — || April 1, 2005 || Anderson Mesa || LONEOS || EOS || align=right | 2.7 km || 
|-id=002 bgcolor=#d6d6d6
| 236002 ||  || — || April 2, 2005 || Mount Lemmon || Mount Lemmon Survey || — || align=right | 5.0 km || 
|-id=003 bgcolor=#d6d6d6
| 236003 ||  || — || April 2, 2005 || Mount Lemmon || Mount Lemmon Survey || HYG || align=right | 4.3 km || 
|-id=004 bgcolor=#d6d6d6
| 236004 ||  || — || April 3, 2005 || Palomar || NEAT || — || align=right | 3.7 km || 
|-id=005 bgcolor=#d6d6d6
| 236005 ||  || — || April 4, 2005 || Kitt Peak || Spacewatch || — || align=right | 3.4 km || 
|-id=006 bgcolor=#d6d6d6
| 236006 ||  || — || April 4, 2005 || Catalina || CSS || — || align=right | 3.6 km || 
|-id=007 bgcolor=#d6d6d6
| 236007 ||  || — || April 4, 2005 || Socorro || LINEAR || — || align=right | 5.3 km || 
|-id=008 bgcolor=#E9E9E9
| 236008 ||  || — || April 5, 2005 || Palomar || NEAT || GEF || align=right | 3.8 km || 
|-id=009 bgcolor=#d6d6d6
| 236009 ||  || — || April 5, 2005 || Mount Lemmon || Mount Lemmon Survey || — || align=right | 3.1 km || 
|-id=010 bgcolor=#d6d6d6
| 236010 ||  || — || April 4, 2005 || Kitt Peak || Spacewatch || EOS || align=right | 2.7 km || 
|-id=011 bgcolor=#d6d6d6
| 236011 ||  || — || April 4, 2005 || Catalina || CSS || EOS || align=right | 3.3 km || 
|-id=012 bgcolor=#d6d6d6
| 236012 ||  || — || April 6, 2005 || Catalina || CSS || — || align=right | 4.5 km || 
|-id=013 bgcolor=#d6d6d6
| 236013 ||  || — || April 7, 2005 || Mount Lemmon || Mount Lemmon Survey || — || align=right | 4.1 km || 
|-id=014 bgcolor=#d6d6d6
| 236014 ||  || — || April 4, 2005 || Kitt Peak || Spacewatch || — || align=right | 3.0 km || 
|-id=015 bgcolor=#d6d6d6
| 236015 ||  || — || April 5, 2005 || Mount Lemmon || Mount Lemmon Survey || THM || align=right | 4.1 km || 
|-id=016 bgcolor=#d6d6d6
| 236016 ||  || — || April 6, 2005 || Kitt Peak || Spacewatch || EUP || align=right | 4.4 km || 
|-id=017 bgcolor=#d6d6d6
| 236017 ||  || — || April 6, 2005 || Kitt Peak || Spacewatch || — || align=right | 4.1 km || 
|-id=018 bgcolor=#d6d6d6
| 236018 ||  || — || April 6, 2005 || Mount Lemmon || Mount Lemmon Survey || HYG || align=right | 3.8 km || 
|-id=019 bgcolor=#d6d6d6
| 236019 ||  || — || April 7, 2005 || Kitt Peak || Spacewatch || — || align=right | 4.4 km || 
|-id=020 bgcolor=#d6d6d6
| 236020 ||  || — || April 10, 2005 || Kitt Peak || Spacewatch || — || align=right | 4.4 km || 
|-id=021 bgcolor=#d6d6d6
| 236021 ||  || — || April 6, 2005 || Kitt Peak || Spacewatch || — || align=right | 4.0 km || 
|-id=022 bgcolor=#d6d6d6
| 236022 ||  || — || April 5, 2005 || Kitt Peak || Spacewatch || THM || align=right | 3.6 km || 
|-id=023 bgcolor=#E9E9E9
| 236023 ||  || — || April 6, 2005 || Mount Lemmon || Mount Lemmon Survey || MRX || align=right | 1.3 km || 
|-id=024 bgcolor=#FA8072
| 236024 ||  || — || April 3, 2005 || Siding Spring || SSS || H || align=right | 1.3 km || 
|-id=025 bgcolor=#d6d6d6
| 236025 ||  || — || April 10, 2005 || Kitt Peak || Spacewatch || — || align=right | 4.4 km || 
|-id=026 bgcolor=#d6d6d6
| 236026 ||  || — || April 12, 2005 || Mount Lemmon || Mount Lemmon Survey || TIR || align=right | 2.8 km || 
|-id=027 bgcolor=#d6d6d6
| 236027 ||  || — || April 6, 2005 || Kitt Peak || Spacewatch || — || align=right | 4.7 km || 
|-id=028 bgcolor=#d6d6d6
| 236028 ||  || — || April 11, 2005 || Kitt Peak || Spacewatch || HYG || align=right | 4.2 km || 
|-id=029 bgcolor=#d6d6d6
| 236029 ||  || — || April 12, 2005 || Kitt Peak || Spacewatch || — || align=right | 3.5 km || 
|-id=030 bgcolor=#E9E9E9
| 236030 ||  || — || April 9, 2005 || Socorro || LINEAR || — || align=right | 3.2 km || 
|-id=031 bgcolor=#d6d6d6
| 236031 ||  || — || April 13, 2005 || Anderson Mesa || LONEOS || — || align=right | 2.8 km || 
|-id=032 bgcolor=#d6d6d6
| 236032 ||  || — || April 11, 2005 || Junk Bond || Junk Bond Obs. || — || align=right | 3.2 km || 
|-id=033 bgcolor=#d6d6d6
| 236033 ||  || — || April 12, 2005 || Socorro || LINEAR || — || align=right | 2.1 km || 
|-id=034 bgcolor=#d6d6d6
| 236034 ||  || — || April 12, 2005 || Anderson Mesa || LONEOS || — || align=right | 6.0 km || 
|-id=035 bgcolor=#d6d6d6
| 236035 ||  || — || April 12, 2005 || Mount Lemmon || Mount Lemmon Survey || — || align=right | 4.5 km || 
|-id=036 bgcolor=#d6d6d6
| 236036 ||  || — || April 13, 2005 || Anderson Mesa || LONEOS || — || align=right | 3.7 km || 
|-id=037 bgcolor=#d6d6d6
| 236037 ||  || — || April 12, 2005 || Anderson Mesa || LONEOS || TIR || align=right | 4.0 km || 
|-id=038 bgcolor=#d6d6d6
| 236038 ||  || — || April 5, 2005 || Catalina || CSS || EUP || align=right | 4.6 km || 
|-id=039 bgcolor=#d6d6d6
| 236039 ||  || — || April 12, 2005 || Kitt Peak || Spacewatch || — || align=right | 3.5 km || 
|-id=040 bgcolor=#d6d6d6
| 236040 ||  || — || April 1, 2005 || Kitt Peak || Spacewatch || EOS || align=right | 2.6 km || 
|-id=041 bgcolor=#d6d6d6
| 236041 ||  || — || April 12, 2005 || Anderson Mesa || LONEOS || URS || align=right | 5.0 km || 
|-id=042 bgcolor=#d6d6d6
| 236042 ||  || — || April 4, 2005 || Mount Lemmon || Mount Lemmon Survey || — || align=right | 3.4 km || 
|-id=043 bgcolor=#d6d6d6
| 236043 ||  || — || April 7, 2005 || Kitt Peak || Spacewatch || — || align=right | 4.2 km || 
|-id=044 bgcolor=#d6d6d6
| 236044 ||  || — || April 9, 2005 || Kitt Peak || Spacewatch || — || align=right | 4.7 km || 
|-id=045 bgcolor=#d6d6d6
| 236045 ||  || — || April 16, 2005 || Jarnac || Jarnac Obs. || — || align=right | 3.6 km || 
|-id=046 bgcolor=#d6d6d6
| 236046 ||  || — || April 16, 2005 || Kitt Peak || Spacewatch || — || align=right | 3.2 km || 
|-id=047 bgcolor=#d6d6d6
| 236047 ||  || — || April 30, 2005 || Kitt Peak || Spacewatch || HYG || align=right | 3.4 km || 
|-id=048 bgcolor=#d6d6d6
| 236048 ||  || — || May 3, 2005 || Kitt Peak || Spacewatch || — || align=right | 2.8 km || 
|-id=049 bgcolor=#d6d6d6
| 236049 ||  || — || May 1, 2005 || Kitt Peak || Spacewatch || — || align=right | 5.6 km || 
|-id=050 bgcolor=#fefefe
| 236050 ||  || — || May 6, 2005 || Catalina || CSS || H || align=right data-sort-value="0.96" | 960 m || 
|-id=051 bgcolor=#E9E9E9
| 236051 ||  || — || May 1, 2005 || Palomar || NEAT || — || align=right | 5.0 km || 
|-id=052 bgcolor=#d6d6d6
| 236052 ||  || — || May 4, 2005 || Kitt Peak || Spacewatch || — || align=right | 3.2 km || 
|-id=053 bgcolor=#d6d6d6
| 236053 ||  || — || May 4, 2005 || Catalina || CSS || THB || align=right | 3.8 km || 
|-id=054 bgcolor=#d6d6d6
| 236054 ||  || — || May 8, 2005 || Mayhill || A. Lowe || LIX || align=right | 5.5 km || 
|-id=055 bgcolor=#d6d6d6
| 236055 ||  || — || May 2, 2005 || Kitt Peak || Spacewatch || — || align=right | 3.1 km || 
|-id=056 bgcolor=#d6d6d6
| 236056 ||  || — || May 2, 2005 || Bergisch Gladbach || W. Bickel || — || align=right | 3.4 km || 
|-id=057 bgcolor=#d6d6d6
| 236057 ||  || — || May 3, 2005 || Kitt Peak || Spacewatch || — || align=right | 3.6 km || 
|-id=058 bgcolor=#d6d6d6
| 236058 ||  || — || May 3, 2005 || Kitt Peak || Spacewatch || URS || align=right | 5.3 km || 
|-id=059 bgcolor=#d6d6d6
| 236059 ||  || — || May 6, 2005 || Kitt Peak || Spacewatch || ALA || align=right | 5.2 km || 
|-id=060 bgcolor=#d6d6d6
| 236060 ||  || — || May 3, 2005 || Kitt Peak || Spacewatch || THM || align=right | 2.6 km || 
|-id=061 bgcolor=#d6d6d6
| 236061 ||  || — || May 10, 2005 || Mayhill || A. Lowe || — || align=right | 3.7 km || 
|-id=062 bgcolor=#d6d6d6
| 236062 ||  || — || May 4, 2005 || Kitt Peak || Spacewatch || HYG || align=right | 3.0 km || 
|-id=063 bgcolor=#d6d6d6
| 236063 ||  || — || May 4, 2005 || Catalina || CSS || — || align=right | 5.2 km || 
|-id=064 bgcolor=#d6d6d6
| 236064 ||  || — || May 7, 2005 || Catalina || CSS || — || align=right | 3.3 km || 
|-id=065 bgcolor=#d6d6d6
| 236065 ||  || — || May 9, 2005 || Catalina || CSS || — || align=right | 6.2 km || 
|-id=066 bgcolor=#d6d6d6
| 236066 ||  || — || May 9, 2005 || Catalina || CSS || EUP || align=right | 4.2 km || 
|-id=067 bgcolor=#d6d6d6
| 236067 ||  || — || May 8, 2005 || Catalina || CSS || — || align=right | 4.7 km || 
|-id=068 bgcolor=#fefefe
| 236068 ||  || — || May 10, 2005 || Catalina || CSS || H || align=right data-sort-value="0.93" | 930 m || 
|-id=069 bgcolor=#d6d6d6
| 236069 ||  || — || May 9, 2005 || Mount Lemmon || Mount Lemmon Survey || — || align=right | 3.7 km || 
|-id=070 bgcolor=#d6d6d6
| 236070 ||  || — || May 9, 2005 || Anderson Mesa || LONEOS || — || align=right | 3.5 km || 
|-id=071 bgcolor=#d6d6d6
| 236071 ||  || — || May 9, 2005 || Catalina || CSS || VER || align=right | 4.0 km || 
|-id=072 bgcolor=#d6d6d6
| 236072 ||  || — || May 10, 2005 || Kitt Peak || Spacewatch || HYG || align=right | 5.1 km || 
|-id=073 bgcolor=#d6d6d6
| 236073 ||  || — || May 11, 2005 || Palomar || NEAT || — || align=right | 4.5 km || 
|-id=074 bgcolor=#d6d6d6
| 236074 ||  || — || May 12, 2005 || Mount Lemmon || Mount Lemmon Survey || — || align=right | 4.2 km || 
|-id=075 bgcolor=#d6d6d6
| 236075 ||  || — || May 11, 2005 || Catalina || CSS || LIX || align=right | 5.2 km || 
|-id=076 bgcolor=#d6d6d6
| 236076 ||  || — || May 13, 2005 || Kitt Peak || Spacewatch || EOS || align=right | 3.4 km || 
|-id=077 bgcolor=#d6d6d6
| 236077 ||  || — || May 6, 2005 || Catalina || CSS || — || align=right | 3.9 km || 
|-id=078 bgcolor=#d6d6d6
| 236078 ||  || — || May 3, 2005 || Kitt Peak || Spacewatch || HYG || align=right | 2.9 km || 
|-id=079 bgcolor=#d6d6d6
| 236079 ||  || — || May 6, 2005 || Catalina || CSS || — || align=right | 3.9 km || 
|-id=080 bgcolor=#d6d6d6
| 236080 ||  || — || May 7, 2005 || Kitt Peak || Spacewatch || — || align=right | 4.0 km || 
|-id=081 bgcolor=#d6d6d6
| 236081 ||  || — || May 8, 2005 || Kitt Peak || Spacewatch || — || align=right | 3.4 km || 
|-id=082 bgcolor=#d6d6d6
| 236082 ||  || — || May 4, 2005 || Catalina || CSS || — || align=right | 2.8 km || 
|-id=083 bgcolor=#d6d6d6
| 236083 ||  || — || May 1, 2005 || Siding Spring || SSS || TIR || align=right | 3.1 km || 
|-id=084 bgcolor=#d6d6d6
| 236084 ||  || — || May 16, 2005 || Kitt Peak || Spacewatch || EOS || align=right | 3.1 km || 
|-id=085 bgcolor=#d6d6d6
| 236085 ||  || — || May 17, 2005 || Mount Lemmon || Mount Lemmon Survey || — || align=right | 4.0 km || 
|-id=086 bgcolor=#d6d6d6
| 236086 ||  || — || May 29, 2005 || Reedy Creek || J. Broughton || — || align=right | 3.1 km || 
|-id=087 bgcolor=#d6d6d6
| 236087 ||  || — || June 2, 2005 || Catalina || CSS || — || align=right | 3.9 km || 
|-id=088 bgcolor=#d6d6d6
| 236088 ||  || — || June 3, 2005 || Kitt Peak || Spacewatch || — || align=right | 3.7 km || 
|-id=089 bgcolor=#d6d6d6
| 236089 ||  || — || June 10, 2005 || Kitt Peak || Spacewatch || — || align=right | 3.2 km || 
|-id=090 bgcolor=#d6d6d6
| 236090 ||  || — || June 13, 2005 || Kitt Peak || Spacewatch || TRP || align=right | 3.7 km || 
|-id=091 bgcolor=#d6d6d6
| 236091 ||  || — || June 14, 2005 || Kitt Peak || Spacewatch || LIX || align=right | 4.6 km || 
|-id=092 bgcolor=#d6d6d6
| 236092 ||  || — || June 27, 2005 || Kitt Peak || Spacewatch || HYG || align=right | 2.8 km || 
|-id=093 bgcolor=#d6d6d6
| 236093 ||  || — || June 27, 2005 || Kitt Peak || Spacewatch || — || align=right | 3.3 km || 
|-id=094 bgcolor=#fefefe
| 236094 ||  || — || June 29, 2005 || Palomar || NEAT || — || align=right | 2.6 km || 
|-id=095 bgcolor=#FA8072
| 236095 ||  || — || July 1, 2005 || Socorro || LINEAR || — || align=right | 2.1 km || 
|-id=096 bgcolor=#d6d6d6
| 236096 ||  || — || July 6, 2005 || Kitt Peak || Spacewatch || — || align=right | 3.1 km || 
|-id=097 bgcolor=#fefefe
| 236097 ||  || — || July 4, 2005 || Mount Lemmon || Mount Lemmon Survey || — || align=right | 1.9 km || 
|-id=098 bgcolor=#d6d6d6
| 236098 ||  || — || July 30, 2005 || Socorro || LINEAR || EUP || align=right | 6.7 km || 
|-id=099 bgcolor=#d6d6d6
| 236099 ||  || — || July 27, 2005 || Siding Spring || SSS || LIX || align=right | 5.6 km || 
|-id=100 bgcolor=#d6d6d6
| 236100 ||  || — || August 4, 2005 || Palomar || NEAT || HIL3:2 || align=right | 9.8 km || 
|}

236101–236200 

|-bgcolor=#d6d6d6
| 236101 ||  || — || August 24, 2005 || Palomar || NEAT || LIX || align=right | 5.7 km || 
|-id=102 bgcolor=#d6d6d6
| 236102 ||  || — || August 27, 2005 || Kitt Peak || Spacewatch || — || align=right | 4.5 km || 
|-id=103 bgcolor=#d6d6d6
| 236103 ||  || — || August 28, 2005 || Kitt Peak || Spacewatch || SHU3:2 || align=right | 7.3 km || 
|-id=104 bgcolor=#FA8072
| 236104 ||  || — || August 29, 2005 || Socorro || LINEAR || — || align=right | 1.0 km || 
|-id=105 bgcolor=#fefefe
| 236105 ||  || — || August 29, 2005 || Kitt Peak || Spacewatch || — || align=right data-sort-value="0.74" | 740 m || 
|-id=106 bgcolor=#fefefe
| 236106 ||  || — || August 30, 2005 || Socorro || LINEAR || — || align=right | 1.2 km || 
|-id=107 bgcolor=#d6d6d6
| 236107 ||  || — || August 27, 2005 || Palomar || NEAT || — || align=right | 5.9 km || 
|-id=108 bgcolor=#d6d6d6
| 236108 ||  || — || August 27, 2005 || Haleakala || NEAT || — || align=right | 5.7 km || 
|-id=109 bgcolor=#fefefe
| 236109 ||  || — || August 27, 2005 || Palomar || NEAT || FLO || align=right data-sort-value="0.73" | 730 m || 
|-id=110 bgcolor=#fefefe
| 236110 ||  || — || August 28, 2005 || Siding Spring || SSS || ERI || align=right | 2.2 km || 
|-id=111 bgcolor=#fefefe
| 236111 Wolfgangbüttner ||  ||  || September 7, 2005 || Radebeul || M. Fiedler || — || align=right data-sort-value="0.90" | 900 m || 
|-id=112 bgcolor=#fefefe
| 236112 ||  || — || September 24, 2005 || Kitt Peak || Spacewatch || — || align=right data-sort-value="0.95" | 950 m || 
|-id=113 bgcolor=#fefefe
| 236113 ||  || — || September 26, 2005 || Goodricke-Pigott || R. A. Tucker || — || align=right | 3.0 km || 
|-id=114 bgcolor=#d6d6d6
| 236114 ||  || — || September 26, 2005 || Kitt Peak || Spacewatch || SHU3:2 || align=right | 7.1 km || 
|-id=115 bgcolor=#fefefe
| 236115 ||  || — || September 25, 2005 || Palomar || NEAT || FLO || align=right data-sort-value="0.97" | 970 m || 
|-id=116 bgcolor=#d6d6d6
| 236116 ||  || — || September 25, 2005 || Palomar || NEAT || 7:4 || align=right | 6.9 km || 
|-id=117 bgcolor=#fefefe
| 236117 ||  || — || September 26, 2005 || Palomar || NEAT || — || align=right | 1.0 km || 
|-id=118 bgcolor=#d6d6d6
| 236118 ||  || — || September 27, 2005 || Kitt Peak || Spacewatch || 3:2 || align=right | 6.3 km || 
|-id=119 bgcolor=#d6d6d6
| 236119 ||  || — || September 29, 2005 || Anderson Mesa || LONEOS || HIL3:2 || align=right | 9.1 km || 
|-id=120 bgcolor=#fefefe
| 236120 ||  || — || September 24, 2005 || Kitt Peak || Spacewatch || — || align=right data-sort-value="0.93" | 930 m || 
|-id=121 bgcolor=#fefefe
| 236121 ||  || — || September 25, 2005 || Kitt Peak || Spacewatch || — || align=right data-sort-value="0.69" | 690 m || 
|-id=122 bgcolor=#fefefe
| 236122 ||  || — || September 25, 2005 || Kitt Peak || Spacewatch || — || align=right | 1.8 km || 
|-id=123 bgcolor=#fefefe
| 236123 ||  || — || September 26, 2005 || Kitt Peak || Spacewatch || — || align=right data-sort-value="0.63" | 630 m || 
|-id=124 bgcolor=#fefefe
| 236124 ||  || — || September 29, 2005 || Goodricke-Pigott || R. A. Tucker || — || align=right | 1.0 km || 
|-id=125 bgcolor=#fefefe
| 236125 ||  || — || September 30, 2005 || Catalina || CSS || — || align=right | 1.3 km || 
|-id=126 bgcolor=#d6d6d6
| 236126 ||  || — || September 27, 2005 || Socorro || LINEAR || HIL3:2 || align=right | 8.6 km || 
|-id=127 bgcolor=#fefefe
| 236127 ||  || — || September 23, 2005 || Kitt Peak || Spacewatch || — || align=right data-sort-value="0.70" | 700 m || 
|-id=128 bgcolor=#fefefe
| 236128 ||  || — || October 2, 2005 || Palomar || NEAT || — || align=right | 1.3 km || 
|-id=129 bgcolor=#fefefe
| 236129 Oysterbay ||  ||  || October 1, 2005 || Catalina || R. A. Kowalski || — || align=right data-sort-value="0.83" | 830 m || 
|-id=130 bgcolor=#fefefe
| 236130 ||  || — || October 1, 2005 || Mount Lemmon || Mount Lemmon Survey || — || align=right | 1.4 km || 
|-id=131 bgcolor=#fefefe
| 236131 ||  || — || October 2, 2005 || Anderson Mesa || LONEOS || — || align=right | 1.2 km || 
|-id=132 bgcolor=#fefefe
| 236132 ||  || — || October 1, 2005 || Kitt Peak || Spacewatch || — || align=right data-sort-value="0.95" | 950 m || 
|-id=133 bgcolor=#fefefe
| 236133 ||  || — || October 5, 2005 || Mount Lemmon || Mount Lemmon Survey || — || align=right data-sort-value="0.90" | 900 m || 
|-id=134 bgcolor=#fefefe
| 236134 ||  || — || October 1, 2005 || Mount Lemmon || Mount Lemmon Survey || — || align=right | 1.1 km || 
|-id=135 bgcolor=#fefefe
| 236135 ||  || — || October 7, 2005 || Kitt Peak || Spacewatch || NYS || align=right | 1.7 km || 
|-id=136 bgcolor=#fefefe
| 236136 ||  || — || October 9, 2005 || Kitt Peak || Spacewatch || — || align=right | 1.4 km || 
|-id=137 bgcolor=#fefefe
| 236137 ||  || — || October 1, 2005 || Kitt Peak || Spacewatch || — || align=right | 1.0 km || 
|-id=138 bgcolor=#fefefe
| 236138 ||  || — || October 25, 2005 || Goodricke-Pigott || R. A. Tucker || PHO || align=right | 3.8 km || 
|-id=139 bgcolor=#fefefe
| 236139 ||  || — || October 22, 2005 || Kitt Peak || Spacewatch || — || align=right data-sort-value="0.87" | 870 m || 
|-id=140 bgcolor=#fefefe
| 236140 ||  || — || October 22, 2005 || Kitt Peak || Spacewatch || NYS || align=right data-sort-value="0.92" | 920 m || 
|-id=141 bgcolor=#fefefe
| 236141 ||  || — || October 23, 2005 || Catalina || CSS || FLO || align=right data-sort-value="0.66" | 660 m || 
|-id=142 bgcolor=#fefefe
| 236142 ||  || — || October 25, 2005 || Catalina || CSS || — || align=right | 1.2 km || 
|-id=143 bgcolor=#fefefe
| 236143 ||  || — || October 22, 2005 || Kitt Peak || Spacewatch || — || align=right data-sort-value="0.91" | 910 m || 
|-id=144 bgcolor=#fefefe
| 236144 ||  || — || October 22, 2005 || Kitt Peak || Spacewatch || — || align=right | 1.7 km || 
|-id=145 bgcolor=#fefefe
| 236145 ||  || — || October 22, 2005 || Kitt Peak || Spacewatch || FLO || align=right data-sort-value="0.75" | 750 m || 
|-id=146 bgcolor=#fefefe
| 236146 ||  || — || October 22, 2005 || Palomar || NEAT || — || align=right | 1.0 km || 
|-id=147 bgcolor=#fefefe
| 236147 ||  || — || October 26, 2005 || Kitt Peak || Spacewatch || SUL || align=right | 2.6 km || 
|-id=148 bgcolor=#fefefe
| 236148 ||  || — || October 26, 2005 || Kitt Peak || Spacewatch || V || align=right data-sort-value="0.80" | 800 m || 
|-id=149 bgcolor=#fefefe
| 236149 ||  || — || October 24, 2005 || Kitt Peak || Spacewatch || — || align=right data-sort-value="0.84" | 840 m || 
|-id=150 bgcolor=#fefefe
| 236150 ||  || — || October 24, 2005 || Kitt Peak || Spacewatch || — || align=right data-sort-value="0.70" | 700 m || 
|-id=151 bgcolor=#fefefe
| 236151 ||  || — || October 25, 2005 || Kitt Peak || Spacewatch || FLO || align=right data-sort-value="0.61" | 610 m || 
|-id=152 bgcolor=#fefefe
| 236152 ||  || — || October 25, 2005 || Kitt Peak || Spacewatch || — || align=right | 1.4 km || 
|-id=153 bgcolor=#fefefe
| 236153 ||  || — || October 25, 2005 || Kitt Peak || Spacewatch || — || align=right data-sort-value="0.87" | 870 m || 
|-id=154 bgcolor=#fefefe
| 236154 ||  || — || October 25, 2005 || Kitt Peak || Spacewatch || FLO || align=right data-sort-value="0.84" | 840 m || 
|-id=155 bgcolor=#fefefe
| 236155 ||  || — || October 23, 2005 || Palomar || NEAT || FLO || align=right data-sort-value="0.89" | 890 m || 
|-id=156 bgcolor=#fefefe
| 236156 ||  || — || October 26, 2005 || Kitt Peak || Spacewatch || — || align=right data-sort-value="0.91" | 910 m || 
|-id=157 bgcolor=#fefefe
| 236157 ||  || — || October 29, 2005 || Kitt Peak || Spacewatch || — || align=right data-sort-value="0.92" | 920 m || 
|-id=158 bgcolor=#fefefe
| 236158 ||  || — || October 29, 2005 || Catalina || CSS || — || align=right | 1.2 km || 
|-id=159 bgcolor=#fefefe
| 236159 ||  || — || October 29, 2005 || Mount Lemmon || Mount Lemmon Survey || — || align=right data-sort-value="0.73" | 730 m || 
|-id=160 bgcolor=#fefefe
| 236160 ||  || — || October 27, 2005 || Mount Lemmon || Mount Lemmon Survey || — || align=right data-sort-value="0.99" | 990 m || 
|-id=161 bgcolor=#fefefe
| 236161 ||  || — || October 31, 2005 || Socorro || LINEAR || — || align=right data-sort-value="0.87" | 870 m || 
|-id=162 bgcolor=#fefefe
| 236162 ||  || — || October 28, 2005 || Kitt Peak || Spacewatch || FLO || align=right data-sort-value="0.64" | 640 m || 
|-id=163 bgcolor=#fefefe
| 236163 ||  || — || October 28, 2005 || Mount Lemmon || Mount Lemmon Survey || — || align=right data-sort-value="0.66" | 660 m || 
|-id=164 bgcolor=#fefefe
| 236164 ||  || — || October 31, 2005 || Mount Lemmon || Mount Lemmon Survey || — || align=right | 1.1 km || 
|-id=165 bgcolor=#fefefe
| 236165 ||  || — || October 29, 2005 || Mount Lemmon || Mount Lemmon Survey || V || align=right data-sort-value="0.88" | 880 m || 
|-id=166 bgcolor=#fefefe
| 236166 ||  || — || October 26, 2005 || Anderson Mesa || LONEOS || — || align=right | 1.3 km || 
|-id=167 bgcolor=#fefefe
| 236167 ||  || — || October 27, 2005 || Mount Lemmon || Mount Lemmon Survey || FLO || align=right data-sort-value="0.88" | 880 m || 
|-id=168 bgcolor=#fefefe
| 236168 ||  || — || October 28, 2005 || Mount Lemmon || Mount Lemmon Survey || FLO || align=right data-sort-value="0.85" | 850 m || 
|-id=169 bgcolor=#fefefe
| 236169 ||  || — || October 30, 2005 || Mount Lemmon || Mount Lemmon Survey || NYS || align=right data-sort-value="0.87" | 870 m || 
|-id=170 bgcolor=#fefefe
| 236170 Cholnoky ||  ||  || November 9, 2005 || Piszkéstető || K. Sárneczky || — || align=right | 1.0 km || 
|-id=171 bgcolor=#fefefe
| 236171 ||  || — || November 3, 2005 || Socorro || LINEAR || — || align=right data-sort-value="0.79" | 790 m || 
|-id=172 bgcolor=#fefefe
| 236172 ||  || — || November 4, 2005 || Kitt Peak || Spacewatch || — || align=right | 2.2 km || 
|-id=173 bgcolor=#fefefe
| 236173 ||  || — || November 4, 2005 || Kitt Peak || Spacewatch || — || align=right | 1.4 km || 
|-id=174 bgcolor=#fefefe
| 236174 ||  || — || November 4, 2005 || Kitt Peak || Spacewatch || — || align=right | 1.2 km || 
|-id=175 bgcolor=#fefefe
| 236175 ||  || — || November 3, 2005 || Catalina || CSS || FLO || align=right data-sort-value="0.77" | 770 m || 
|-id=176 bgcolor=#fefefe
| 236176 ||  || — || November 3, 2005 || Mount Lemmon || Mount Lemmon Survey || FLO || align=right data-sort-value="0.96" | 960 m || 
|-id=177 bgcolor=#fefefe
| 236177 ||  || — || November 4, 2005 || Mount Lemmon || Mount Lemmon Survey || — || align=right | 1.3 km || 
|-id=178 bgcolor=#fefefe
| 236178 ||  || — || November 5, 2005 || Kitt Peak || Spacewatch || — || align=right data-sort-value="0.89" | 890 m || 
|-id=179 bgcolor=#fefefe
| 236179 ||  || — || November 6, 2005 || Anderson Mesa || LONEOS || — || align=right data-sort-value="0.78" | 780 m || 
|-id=180 bgcolor=#fefefe
| 236180 ||  || — || November 5, 2005 || Socorro || LINEAR || — || align=right | 1.2 km || 
|-id=181 bgcolor=#fefefe
| 236181 ||  || — || November 5, 2005 || Kitt Peak || Spacewatch || MAS || align=right data-sort-value="0.72" | 720 m || 
|-id=182 bgcolor=#fefefe
| 236182 ||  || — || November 11, 2005 || Kitt Peak || Spacewatch || NYS || align=right data-sort-value="0.76" | 760 m || 
|-id=183 bgcolor=#fefefe
| 236183 ||  || — || November 4, 2005 || Kitt Peak || Spacewatch || — || align=right data-sort-value="0.84" | 840 m || 
|-id=184 bgcolor=#FA8072
| 236184 ||  || — || November 23, 2005 || Socorro || LINEAR || — || align=right | 1.5 km || 
|-id=185 bgcolor=#fefefe
| 236185 ||  || — || November 17, 2005 || Palomar || NEAT || — || align=right data-sort-value="0.99" | 990 m || 
|-id=186 bgcolor=#fefefe
| 236186 ||  || — || November 22, 2005 || Kitt Peak || Spacewatch || FLO || align=right | 1.0 km || 
|-id=187 bgcolor=#fefefe
| 236187 ||  || — || November 22, 2005 || Kitt Peak || Spacewatch || — || align=right | 1.0 km || 
|-id=188 bgcolor=#fefefe
| 236188 ||  || — || November 21, 2005 || Catalina || CSS || NYS || align=right data-sort-value="0.69" | 690 m || 
|-id=189 bgcolor=#fefefe
| 236189 ||  || — || November 22, 2005 || Kitt Peak || Spacewatch || — || align=right data-sort-value="0.95" | 950 m || 
|-id=190 bgcolor=#fefefe
| 236190 ||  || — || November 22, 2005 || Kitt Peak || Spacewatch || NYS || align=right data-sort-value="0.82" | 820 m || 
|-id=191 bgcolor=#fefefe
| 236191 ||  || — || November 25, 2005 || Mount Lemmon || Mount Lemmon Survey || NYS || align=right data-sort-value="0.71" | 710 m || 
|-id=192 bgcolor=#fefefe
| 236192 ||  || — || November 21, 2005 || Kitt Peak || Spacewatch || — || align=right | 1.5 km || 
|-id=193 bgcolor=#fefefe
| 236193 ||  || — || November 25, 2005 || Kitt Peak || Spacewatch || — || align=right data-sort-value="0.94" | 940 m || 
|-id=194 bgcolor=#fefefe
| 236194 ||  || — || November 20, 2005 || Gnosca || S. Sposetti || — || align=right data-sort-value="0.98" | 980 m || 
|-id=195 bgcolor=#fefefe
| 236195 ||  || — || November 30, 2005 || Kitt Peak || Spacewatch || — || align=right | 1.2 km || 
|-id=196 bgcolor=#fefefe
| 236196 ||  || — || November 30, 2005 || Socorro || LINEAR || — || align=right | 1.2 km || 
|-id=197 bgcolor=#fefefe
| 236197 ||  || — || November 21, 2005 || Kitt Peak || Spacewatch || FLO || align=right data-sort-value="0.97" | 970 m || 
|-id=198 bgcolor=#fefefe
| 236198 ||  || — || November 25, 2005 || Kitt Peak || Spacewatch || V || align=right | 1.00 km || 
|-id=199 bgcolor=#fefefe
| 236199 ||  || — || November 25, 2005 || Kitt Peak || Spacewatch || — || align=right data-sort-value="0.83" | 830 m || 
|-id=200 bgcolor=#fefefe
| 236200 ||  || — || November 25, 2005 || Kitt Peak || Spacewatch || V || align=right data-sort-value="0.95" | 950 m || 
|}

236201–236300 

|-bgcolor=#fefefe
| 236201 ||  || — || November 26, 2005 || Mount Lemmon || Mount Lemmon Survey || MAS || align=right | 1.6 km || 
|-id=202 bgcolor=#fefefe
| 236202 ||  || — || November 28, 2005 || Catalina || CSS || NYS || align=right data-sort-value="0.88" | 880 m || 
|-id=203 bgcolor=#fefefe
| 236203 ||  || — || November 29, 2005 || Socorro || LINEAR || — || align=right data-sort-value="0.98" | 980 m || 
|-id=204 bgcolor=#fefefe
| 236204 ||  || — || November 28, 2005 || Catalina || CSS || — || align=right | 1.0 km || 
|-id=205 bgcolor=#fefefe
| 236205 ||  || — || November 25, 2005 || Kitt Peak || Spacewatch || — || align=right data-sort-value="0.63" | 630 m || 
|-id=206 bgcolor=#fefefe
| 236206 ||  || — || November 28, 2005 || Catalina || CSS || FLO || align=right | 1.00 km || 
|-id=207 bgcolor=#fefefe
| 236207 ||  || — || November 28, 2005 || Socorro || LINEAR || — || align=right | 1.2 km || 
|-id=208 bgcolor=#fefefe
| 236208 ||  || — || November 30, 2005 || Socorro || LINEAR || KLI || align=right | 3.3 km || 
|-id=209 bgcolor=#d6d6d6
| 236209 ||  || — || November 25, 2005 || Mount Lemmon || Mount Lemmon Survey || HIL3:2 || align=right | 6.3 km || 
|-id=210 bgcolor=#fefefe
| 236210 ||  || — || November 30, 2005 || Kitt Peak || Spacewatch || MAS || align=right data-sort-value="0.93" | 930 m || 
|-id=211 bgcolor=#fefefe
| 236211 ||  || — || November 28, 2005 || Socorro || LINEAR || — || align=right | 2.2 km || 
|-id=212 bgcolor=#fefefe
| 236212 ||  || — || November 30, 2005 || Socorro || LINEAR || NYS || align=right data-sort-value="0.86" | 860 m || 
|-id=213 bgcolor=#fefefe
| 236213 ||  || — || November 25, 2005 || Mount Lemmon || Mount Lemmon Survey || — || align=right | 1.2 km || 
|-id=214 bgcolor=#E9E9E9
| 236214 ||  || — || November 26, 2005 || Socorro || LINEAR || — || align=right | 3.0 km || 
|-id=215 bgcolor=#fefefe
| 236215 ||  || — || November 29, 2005 || Mount Lemmon || Mount Lemmon Survey || — || align=right data-sort-value="0.62" | 620 m || 
|-id=216 bgcolor=#fefefe
| 236216 ||  || — || November 30, 2005 || Kitt Peak || Spacewatch || — || align=right data-sort-value="0.98" | 980 m || 
|-id=217 bgcolor=#fefefe
| 236217 ||  || — || November 30, 2005 || Kitt Peak || Spacewatch || — || align=right data-sort-value="0.93" | 930 m || 
|-id=218 bgcolor=#fefefe
| 236218 ||  || — || November 30, 2005 || Kitt Peak || Spacewatch || NYS || align=right data-sort-value="0.76" | 760 m || 
|-id=219 bgcolor=#fefefe
| 236219 ||  || — || November 28, 2005 || Socorro || LINEAR || — || align=right | 1.0 km || 
|-id=220 bgcolor=#E9E9E9
| 236220 ||  || — || November 28, 2005 || Socorro || LINEAR || — || align=right | 1.9 km || 
|-id=221 bgcolor=#d6d6d6
| 236221 ||  || — || November 30, 2005 || Kitt Peak || Spacewatch || — || align=right | 3.9 km || 
|-id=222 bgcolor=#fefefe
| 236222 ||  || — || November 28, 2005 || Socorro || LINEAR || NYS || align=right data-sort-value="0.87" | 870 m || 
|-id=223 bgcolor=#fefefe
| 236223 ||  || — || November 29, 2005 || Kitt Peak || Spacewatch || NYS || align=right data-sort-value="0.94" | 940 m || 
|-id=224 bgcolor=#fefefe
| 236224 ||  || — || December 1, 2005 || Socorro || LINEAR || — || align=right data-sort-value="0.88" | 880 m || 
|-id=225 bgcolor=#fefefe
| 236225 ||  || — || December 2, 2005 || Socorro || LINEAR || FLO || align=right | 2.4 km || 
|-id=226 bgcolor=#fefefe
| 236226 ||  || — || December 5, 2005 || Catalina || CSS || — || align=right data-sort-value="0.94" | 940 m || 
|-id=227 bgcolor=#fefefe
| 236227 ||  || — || December 4, 2005 || Kitt Peak || Spacewatch || — || align=right data-sort-value="0.81" | 810 m || 
|-id=228 bgcolor=#fefefe
| 236228 ||  || — || December 5, 2005 || Mount Lemmon || Mount Lemmon Survey || — || align=right | 1.1 km || 
|-id=229 bgcolor=#fefefe
| 236229 ||  || — || December 6, 2005 || Kitt Peak || Spacewatch || — || align=right data-sort-value="0.77" | 770 m || 
|-id=230 bgcolor=#fefefe
| 236230 ||  || — || December 6, 2005 || Kitt Peak || Spacewatch || NYS || align=right data-sort-value="0.81" | 810 m || 
|-id=231 bgcolor=#E9E9E9
| 236231 ||  || — || December 6, 2005 || Kitt Peak || Spacewatch || — || align=right | 1.2 km || 
|-id=232 bgcolor=#fefefe
| 236232 ||  || — || December 2, 2005 || Kitt Peak || M. W. Buie || MAS || align=right data-sort-value="0.78" | 780 m || 
|-id=233 bgcolor=#fefefe
| 236233 ||  || — || December 21, 2005 || Kitt Peak || Spacewatch || — || align=right data-sort-value="0.83" | 830 m || 
|-id=234 bgcolor=#fefefe
| 236234 ||  || — || December 23, 2005 || Kitt Peak || Spacewatch || — || align=right data-sort-value="0.94" | 940 m || 
|-id=235 bgcolor=#E9E9E9
| 236235 ||  || — || December 22, 2005 || Kitt Peak || Spacewatch || KRM || align=right | 3.3 km || 
|-id=236 bgcolor=#fefefe
| 236236 ||  || — || December 26, 2005 || 7300 Observatory || W. K. Y. Yeung || — || align=right data-sort-value="0.94" | 940 m || 
|-id=237 bgcolor=#fefefe
| 236237 ||  || — || December 24, 2005 || Kitt Peak || Spacewatch || V || align=right data-sort-value="0.92" | 920 m || 
|-id=238 bgcolor=#fefefe
| 236238 ||  || — || December 26, 2005 || Catalina || CSS || — || align=right | 2.0 km || 
|-id=239 bgcolor=#fefefe
| 236239 ||  || — || December 22, 2005 || Kitt Peak || Spacewatch || MAS || align=right data-sort-value="0.76" | 760 m || 
|-id=240 bgcolor=#fefefe
| 236240 ||  || — || December 26, 2005 || Mount Lemmon || Mount Lemmon Survey || — || align=right data-sort-value="0.91" | 910 m || 
|-id=241 bgcolor=#E9E9E9
| 236241 ||  || — || December 26, 2005 || Mount Lemmon || Mount Lemmon Survey || — || align=right | 3.8 km || 
|-id=242 bgcolor=#fefefe
| 236242 ||  || — || December 25, 2005 || Kitt Peak || Spacewatch || — || align=right | 1.0 km || 
|-id=243 bgcolor=#fefefe
| 236243 ||  || — || December 24, 2005 || Kitt Peak || Spacewatch || NYS || align=right data-sort-value="0.86" | 860 m || 
|-id=244 bgcolor=#fefefe
| 236244 ||  || — || December 26, 2005 || Mount Lemmon || Mount Lemmon Survey || MAS || align=right | 1.1 km || 
|-id=245 bgcolor=#fefefe
| 236245 ||  || — || December 26, 2005 || Mount Lemmon || Mount Lemmon Survey || — || align=right | 1.9 km || 
|-id=246 bgcolor=#E9E9E9
| 236246 ||  || — || December 26, 2005 || Mount Lemmon || Mount Lemmon Survey || PAD || align=right | 3.9 km || 
|-id=247 bgcolor=#fefefe
| 236247 ||  || — || December 26, 2005 || Mount Lemmon || Mount Lemmon Survey || — || align=right | 1.0 km || 
|-id=248 bgcolor=#fefefe
| 236248 ||  || — || December 27, 2005 || Mount Lemmon || Mount Lemmon Survey || NYS || align=right data-sort-value="0.82" | 820 m || 
|-id=249 bgcolor=#fefefe
| 236249 ||  || — || December 24, 2005 || Kitt Peak || Spacewatch || NYS || align=right | 1.0 km || 
|-id=250 bgcolor=#fefefe
| 236250 ||  || — || December 25, 2005 || Mount Lemmon || Mount Lemmon Survey || NYS || align=right data-sort-value="0.72" | 720 m || 
|-id=251 bgcolor=#fefefe
| 236251 ||  || — || December 25, 2005 || Kitt Peak || Spacewatch || — || align=right | 2.5 km || 
|-id=252 bgcolor=#fefefe
| 236252 ||  || — || December 27, 2005 || Kitt Peak || Spacewatch || — || align=right | 2.5 km || 
|-id=253 bgcolor=#fefefe
| 236253 ||  || — || December 26, 2005 || Kitt Peak || Spacewatch || — || align=right | 1.4 km || 
|-id=254 bgcolor=#fefefe
| 236254 ||  || — || December 26, 2005 || Kitt Peak || Spacewatch || V || align=right data-sort-value="0.94" | 940 m || 
|-id=255 bgcolor=#fefefe
| 236255 ||  || — || December 28, 2005 || Mount Lemmon || Mount Lemmon Survey || V || align=right data-sort-value="0.95" | 950 m || 
|-id=256 bgcolor=#fefefe
| 236256 ||  || — || December 28, 2005 || Mount Lemmon || Mount Lemmon Survey || — || align=right data-sort-value="0.98" | 980 m || 
|-id=257 bgcolor=#fefefe
| 236257 ||  || — || December 28, 2005 || Mount Lemmon || Mount Lemmon Survey || NYS || align=right data-sort-value="0.76" | 760 m || 
|-id=258 bgcolor=#fefefe
| 236258 ||  || — || December 28, 2005 || Mount Lemmon || Mount Lemmon Survey || NYS || align=right | 1.0 km || 
|-id=259 bgcolor=#fefefe
| 236259 ||  || — || December 28, 2005 || Mount Lemmon || Mount Lemmon Survey || NYS || align=right data-sort-value="0.87" | 870 m || 
|-id=260 bgcolor=#fefefe
| 236260 ||  || — || December 25, 2005 || Kitt Peak || Spacewatch || NYS || align=right data-sort-value="0.93" | 930 m || 
|-id=261 bgcolor=#fefefe
| 236261 ||  || — || December 28, 2005 || Mount Lemmon || Mount Lemmon Survey || NYS || align=right | 1.1 km || 
|-id=262 bgcolor=#fefefe
| 236262 ||  || — || December 29, 2005 || Socorro || LINEAR || — || align=right data-sort-value="0.83" | 830 m || 
|-id=263 bgcolor=#fefefe
| 236263 ||  || — || December 29, 2005 || Socorro || LINEAR || NYS || align=right | 1.2 km || 
|-id=264 bgcolor=#fefefe
| 236264 ||  || — || December 28, 2005 || Kitt Peak || Spacewatch || — || align=right | 2.4 km || 
|-id=265 bgcolor=#fefefe
| 236265 ||  || — || December 29, 2005 || Kitt Peak || Spacewatch || — || align=right data-sort-value="0.99" | 990 m || 
|-id=266 bgcolor=#fefefe
| 236266 ||  || — || December 24, 2005 || Socorro || LINEAR || — || align=right | 1.8 km || 
|-id=267 bgcolor=#fefefe
| 236267 ||  || — || December 29, 2005 || Socorro || LINEAR || — || align=right data-sort-value="0.92" | 920 m || 
|-id=268 bgcolor=#fefefe
| 236268 ||  || — || December 27, 2005 || Kitt Peak || Spacewatch || V || align=right data-sort-value="0.80" | 800 m || 
|-id=269 bgcolor=#fefefe
| 236269 ||  || — || December 30, 2005 || Kitt Peak || Spacewatch || — || align=right | 1.3 km || 
|-id=270 bgcolor=#fefefe
| 236270 ||  || — || December 30, 2005 || Kitt Peak || Spacewatch || — || align=right | 2.0 km || 
|-id=271 bgcolor=#fefefe
| 236271 ||  || — || December 30, 2005 || Kitt Peak || Spacewatch || NYS || align=right data-sort-value="0.80" | 800 m || 
|-id=272 bgcolor=#fefefe
| 236272 ||  || — || December 24, 2005 || Kitt Peak || Spacewatch || NYS || align=right data-sort-value="0.84" | 840 m || 
|-id=273 bgcolor=#fefefe
| 236273 ||  || — || December 25, 2005 || Mount Lemmon || Mount Lemmon Survey || NYS || align=right data-sort-value="0.96" | 960 m || 
|-id=274 bgcolor=#fefefe
| 236274 ||  || — || December 25, 2005 || Kitt Peak || Spacewatch || NYS || align=right | 1.9 km || 
|-id=275 bgcolor=#fefefe
| 236275 ||  || — || December 29, 2005 || Kitt Peak || Spacewatch || MAS || align=right data-sort-value="0.80" | 800 m || 
|-id=276 bgcolor=#fefefe
| 236276 ||  || — || December 30, 2005 || Kitt Peak || Spacewatch || — || align=right | 1.0 km || 
|-id=277 bgcolor=#fefefe
| 236277 ||  || — || December 30, 2005 || Kitt Peak || Spacewatch || NYS || align=right | 2.1 km || 
|-id=278 bgcolor=#fefefe
| 236278 ||  || — || December 28, 2005 || Kitt Peak || Spacewatch || — || align=right data-sort-value="0.99" | 990 m || 
|-id=279 bgcolor=#fefefe
| 236279 ||  || — || December 25, 2005 || Mount Lemmon || Mount Lemmon Survey || V || align=right | 1.2 km || 
|-id=280 bgcolor=#fefefe
| 236280 ||  || — || December 26, 2005 || Mount Lemmon || Mount Lemmon Survey || — || align=right | 1.2 km || 
|-id=281 bgcolor=#fefefe
| 236281 ||  || — || January 2, 2006 || Mount Lemmon || Mount Lemmon Survey || V || align=right data-sort-value="0.90" | 900 m || 
|-id=282 bgcolor=#fefefe
| 236282 ||  || — || January 4, 2006 || Mount Lemmon || Mount Lemmon Survey || MAS || align=right data-sort-value="0.81" | 810 m || 
|-id=283 bgcolor=#fefefe
| 236283 ||  || — || January 4, 2006 || Catalina || CSS || V || align=right | 1.0 km || 
|-id=284 bgcolor=#fefefe
| 236284 ||  || — || January 5, 2006 || Catalina || CSS || — || align=right | 1.1 km || 
|-id=285 bgcolor=#fefefe
| 236285 ||  || — || January 5, 2006 || Mount Lemmon || Mount Lemmon Survey || — || align=right | 1.2 km || 
|-id=286 bgcolor=#E9E9E9
| 236286 ||  || — || January 4, 2006 || Kitt Peak || Spacewatch || — || align=right | 1.4 km || 
|-id=287 bgcolor=#fefefe
| 236287 ||  || — || January 6, 2006 || Mount Lemmon || Mount Lemmon Survey || MAS || align=right | 1.1 km || 
|-id=288 bgcolor=#fefefe
| 236288 ||  || — || January 7, 2006 || Kitt Peak || Spacewatch || NYS || align=right data-sort-value="0.68" | 680 m || 
|-id=289 bgcolor=#fefefe
| 236289 ||  || — || January 5, 2006 || Kitt Peak || Spacewatch || FLO || align=right | 2.1 km || 
|-id=290 bgcolor=#fefefe
| 236290 ||  || — || January 5, 2006 || Kitt Peak || Spacewatch || — || align=right | 1.0 km || 
|-id=291 bgcolor=#E9E9E9
| 236291 ||  || — || January 6, 2006 || Mount Lemmon || Mount Lemmon Survey || — || align=right | 3.2 km || 
|-id=292 bgcolor=#fefefe
| 236292 ||  || — || January 8, 2006 || Anderson Mesa || LONEOS || — || align=right | 1.4 km || 
|-id=293 bgcolor=#fefefe
| 236293 ||  || — || January 8, 2006 || Kitt Peak || Spacewatch || MAS || align=right data-sort-value="0.79" | 790 m || 
|-id=294 bgcolor=#fefefe
| 236294 ||  || — || January 6, 2006 || Mount Lemmon || Mount Lemmon Survey || MAS || align=right | 1.1 km || 
|-id=295 bgcolor=#E9E9E9
| 236295 ||  || — || January 8, 2006 || Mount Lemmon || Mount Lemmon Survey || — || align=right | 1.4 km || 
|-id=296 bgcolor=#fefefe
| 236296 ||  || — || January 6, 2006 || Kitt Peak || Spacewatch || — || align=right data-sort-value="0.98" | 980 m || 
|-id=297 bgcolor=#fefefe
| 236297 ||  || — || January 8, 2006 || Mount Lemmon || Mount Lemmon Survey || PHO || align=right | 1.6 km || 
|-id=298 bgcolor=#fefefe
| 236298 ||  || — || January 5, 2006 || Anderson Mesa || LONEOS || — || align=right | 1.1 km || 
|-id=299 bgcolor=#fefefe
| 236299 ||  || — || January 8, 2006 || Mount Lemmon || Mount Lemmon Survey || NYS || align=right data-sort-value="0.90" | 900 m || 
|-id=300 bgcolor=#fefefe
| 236300 ||  || — || January 7, 2006 || Kitt Peak || Spacewatch || NYS || align=right data-sort-value="0.73" | 730 m || 
|}

236301–236400 

|-bgcolor=#fefefe
| 236301 ||  || — || January 10, 2006 || Kitt Peak || Spacewatch || — || align=right data-sort-value="0.85" | 850 m || 
|-id=302 bgcolor=#E9E9E9
| 236302 ||  || — || January 4, 2006 || Kitt Peak || Spacewatch || — || align=right | 4.6 km || 
|-id=303 bgcolor=#fefefe
| 236303 ||  || — || January 6, 2006 || Kitt Peak || Spacewatch || — || align=right | 1.0 km || 
|-id=304 bgcolor=#fefefe
| 236304 ||  || — || January 10, 2006 || Mount Lemmon || Mount Lemmon Survey || NYS || align=right data-sort-value="0.86" | 860 m || 
|-id=305 bgcolor=#fefefe
| 236305 Adamriess || 2006 BU ||  || January 19, 2006 || Vallemare di Borbona || V. S. Casulli || V || align=right data-sort-value="0.83" | 830 m || 
|-id=306 bgcolor=#fefefe
| 236306 ||  || — || January 20, 2006 || Kitt Peak || Spacewatch || — || align=right data-sort-value="0.86" | 860 m || 
|-id=307 bgcolor=#fefefe
| 236307 ||  || — || January 24, 2006 || Piszkéstető || K. Sárneczky || NYS || align=right data-sort-value="0.88" | 880 m || 
|-id=308 bgcolor=#fefefe
| 236308 ||  || — || January 18, 2006 || Catalina || CSS || — || align=right | 1.1 km || 
|-id=309 bgcolor=#fefefe
| 236309 ||  || — || January 21, 2006 || Anderson Mesa || LONEOS || — || align=right | 1.0 km || 
|-id=310 bgcolor=#fefefe
| 236310 ||  || — || January 22, 2006 || Mount Lemmon || Mount Lemmon Survey || MAS || align=right data-sort-value="0.72" | 720 m || 
|-id=311 bgcolor=#fefefe
| 236311 ||  || — || January 22, 2006 || Mount Lemmon || Mount Lemmon Survey || MAS || align=right data-sort-value="0.80" | 800 m || 
|-id=312 bgcolor=#fefefe
| 236312 ||  || — || January 22, 2006 || Mount Lemmon || Mount Lemmon Survey || NYS || align=right | 2.8 km || 
|-id=313 bgcolor=#fefefe
| 236313 ||  || — || January 23, 2006 || Socorro || LINEAR || — || align=right | 1.4 km || 
|-id=314 bgcolor=#fefefe
| 236314 ||  || — || January 20, 2006 || Kitt Peak || Spacewatch || — || align=right | 2.9 km || 
|-id=315 bgcolor=#fefefe
| 236315 ||  || — || January 21, 2006 || Kitt Peak || Spacewatch || NYS || align=right | 1.2 km || 
|-id=316 bgcolor=#E9E9E9
| 236316 ||  || — || January 23, 2006 || Mount Lemmon || Mount Lemmon Survey || — || align=right | 1.0 km || 
|-id=317 bgcolor=#fefefe
| 236317 ||  || — || January 23, 2006 || Mount Lemmon || Mount Lemmon Survey || — || align=right | 1.0 km || 
|-id=318 bgcolor=#fefefe
| 236318 ||  || — || January 24, 2006 || Socorro || LINEAR || MAS || align=right | 1.6 km || 
|-id=319 bgcolor=#fefefe
| 236319 ||  || — || January 25, 2006 || Kitt Peak || Spacewatch || — || align=right | 1.2 km || 
|-id=320 bgcolor=#E9E9E9
| 236320 ||  || — || January 22, 2006 || Mount Lemmon || Mount Lemmon Survey || — || align=right | 3.5 km || 
|-id=321 bgcolor=#fefefe
| 236321 ||  || — || January 22, 2006 || Catalina || CSS || PHO || align=right | 1.8 km || 
|-id=322 bgcolor=#fefefe
| 236322 ||  || — || January 23, 2006 || Kitt Peak || Spacewatch || — || align=right | 1.2 km || 
|-id=323 bgcolor=#E9E9E9
| 236323 ||  || — || January 23, 2006 || Kitt Peak || Spacewatch || EUN || align=right | 1.3 km || 
|-id=324 bgcolor=#fefefe
| 236324 ||  || — || January 23, 2006 || Kitt Peak || Spacewatch || NYS || align=right | 1.1 km || 
|-id=325 bgcolor=#E9E9E9
| 236325 ||  || — || January 23, 2006 || Mount Lemmon || Mount Lemmon Survey || — || align=right | 1.7 km || 
|-id=326 bgcolor=#fefefe
| 236326 ||  || — || January 24, 2006 || Kitt Peak || Spacewatch || — || align=right data-sort-value="0.88" | 880 m || 
|-id=327 bgcolor=#fefefe
| 236327 ||  || — || January 25, 2006 || Kitt Peak || Spacewatch || MAS || align=right data-sort-value="0.80" | 800 m || 
|-id=328 bgcolor=#fefefe
| 236328 ||  || — || January 25, 2006 || Kitt Peak || Spacewatch || NYS || align=right | 1.0 km || 
|-id=329 bgcolor=#E9E9E9
| 236329 ||  || — || January 25, 2006 || Kitt Peak || Spacewatch || — || align=right | 2.7 km || 
|-id=330 bgcolor=#fefefe
| 236330 ||  || — || January 26, 2006 || Mount Lemmon || Mount Lemmon Survey || NYS || align=right | 1.1 km || 
|-id=331 bgcolor=#E9E9E9
| 236331 ||  || — || January 26, 2006 || Kitt Peak || Spacewatch || — || align=right | 1.8 km || 
|-id=332 bgcolor=#fefefe
| 236332 ||  || — || January 26, 2006 || Kitt Peak || Spacewatch || — || align=right | 1.0 km || 
|-id=333 bgcolor=#fefefe
| 236333 ||  || — || January 26, 2006 || Kitt Peak || Spacewatch || NYS || align=right | 1.1 km || 
|-id=334 bgcolor=#E9E9E9
| 236334 ||  || — || January 23, 2006 || Mount Lemmon || Mount Lemmon Survey || — || align=right | 1.0 km || 
|-id=335 bgcolor=#E9E9E9
| 236335 ||  || — || January 25, 2006 || Kitt Peak || Spacewatch || — || align=right | 1.7 km || 
|-id=336 bgcolor=#E9E9E9
| 236336 ||  || — || January 26, 2006 || Kitt Peak || Spacewatch || HOF || align=right | 2.8 km || 
|-id=337 bgcolor=#fefefe
| 236337 ||  || — || January 26, 2006 || Kitt Peak || Spacewatch || — || align=right | 1.2 km || 
|-id=338 bgcolor=#fefefe
| 236338 ||  || — || January 26, 2006 || Kitt Peak || Spacewatch || — || align=right | 1.1 km || 
|-id=339 bgcolor=#fefefe
| 236339 ||  || — || January 26, 2006 || Kitt Peak || Spacewatch || — || align=right data-sort-value="0.93" | 930 m || 
|-id=340 bgcolor=#fefefe
| 236340 ||  || — || January 26, 2006 || Catalina || CSS || NYS || align=right data-sort-value="0.76" | 760 m || 
|-id=341 bgcolor=#fefefe
| 236341 ||  || — || January 26, 2006 || Kitt Peak || Spacewatch || NYS || align=right data-sort-value="0.80" | 800 m || 
|-id=342 bgcolor=#E9E9E9
| 236342 ||  || — || January 26, 2006 || Kitt Peak || Spacewatch || — || align=right | 1.0 km || 
|-id=343 bgcolor=#E9E9E9
| 236343 ||  || — || January 26, 2006 || Kitt Peak || Spacewatch || RAF || align=right | 1.2 km || 
|-id=344 bgcolor=#E9E9E9
| 236344 ||  || — || January 26, 2006 || Kitt Peak || Spacewatch || — || align=right | 1.5 km || 
|-id=345 bgcolor=#E9E9E9
| 236345 ||  || — || January 27, 2006 || Mount Lemmon || Mount Lemmon Survey || PAE || align=right | 3.6 km || 
|-id=346 bgcolor=#fefefe
| 236346 ||  || — || January 28, 2006 || Mount Lemmon || Mount Lemmon Survey || MAS || align=right | 1.1 km || 
|-id=347 bgcolor=#fefefe
| 236347 ||  || — || January 23, 2006 || Kitt Peak || Spacewatch || — || align=right | 1.7 km || 
|-id=348 bgcolor=#fefefe
| 236348 ||  || — || January 25, 2006 || Anderson Mesa || LONEOS || — || align=right | 1.6 km || 
|-id=349 bgcolor=#E9E9E9
| 236349 ||  || — || January 25, 2006 || Kitt Peak || Spacewatch || HOF || align=right | 4.2 km || 
|-id=350 bgcolor=#E9E9E9
| 236350 ||  || — || January 25, 2006 || Kitt Peak || Spacewatch || — || align=right | 1.2 km || 
|-id=351 bgcolor=#E9E9E9
| 236351 ||  || — || January 25, 2006 || Kitt Peak || Spacewatch || — || align=right | 1.1 km || 
|-id=352 bgcolor=#E9E9E9
| 236352 ||  || — || January 25, 2006 || Kitt Peak || Spacewatch || — || align=right | 3.7 km || 
|-id=353 bgcolor=#fefefe
| 236353 ||  || — || January 26, 2006 || Catalina || CSS || — || align=right | 2.8 km || 
|-id=354 bgcolor=#E9E9E9
| 236354 ||  || — || January 26, 2006 || Mount Lemmon || Mount Lemmon Survey || — || align=right | 3.0 km || 
|-id=355 bgcolor=#fefefe
| 236355 ||  || — || January 26, 2006 || Mount Lemmon || Mount Lemmon Survey || SUL || align=right | 2.8 km || 
|-id=356 bgcolor=#fefefe
| 236356 ||  || — || January 27, 2006 || Mount Lemmon || Mount Lemmon Survey || NYS || align=right | 2.0 km || 
|-id=357 bgcolor=#fefefe
| 236357 ||  || — || January 28, 2006 || Mount Lemmon || Mount Lemmon Survey || — || align=right | 1.2 km || 
|-id=358 bgcolor=#fefefe
| 236358 ||  || — || January 28, 2006 || Kitt Peak || Spacewatch || NYS || align=right data-sort-value="0.87" | 870 m || 
|-id=359 bgcolor=#fefefe
| 236359 ||  || — || January 30, 2006 || Kitt Peak || Spacewatch || NYS || align=right data-sort-value="0.99" | 990 m || 
|-id=360 bgcolor=#fefefe
| 236360 ||  || — || January 30, 2006 || Kitt Peak || Spacewatch || — || align=right | 1.9 km || 
|-id=361 bgcolor=#fefefe
| 236361 ||  || — || January 30, 2006 || Kitt Peak || Spacewatch || — || align=right | 1.2 km || 
|-id=362 bgcolor=#fefefe
| 236362 ||  || — || January 31, 2006 || Mount Lemmon || Mount Lemmon Survey || MAS || align=right data-sort-value="0.88" | 880 m || 
|-id=363 bgcolor=#fefefe
| 236363 ||  || — || January 28, 2006 || Mount Lemmon || Mount Lemmon Survey || NYS || align=right | 1.1 km || 
|-id=364 bgcolor=#E9E9E9
| 236364 ||  || — || January 30, 2006 || Kitt Peak || Spacewatch || — || align=right | 3.8 km || 
|-id=365 bgcolor=#fefefe
| 236365 ||  || — || January 31, 2006 || Kitt Peak || Spacewatch || NYS || align=right data-sort-value="0.81" | 810 m || 
|-id=366 bgcolor=#fefefe
| 236366 ||  || — || January 31, 2006 || Kitt Peak || Spacewatch || MAS || align=right | 1.1 km || 
|-id=367 bgcolor=#fefefe
| 236367 ||  || — || January 31, 2006 || Kitt Peak || Spacewatch || NYS || align=right data-sort-value="0.76" | 760 m || 
|-id=368 bgcolor=#E9E9E9
| 236368 ||  || — || January 31, 2006 || Kitt Peak || Spacewatch || — || align=right | 1.3 km || 
|-id=369 bgcolor=#fefefe
| 236369 ||  || — || January 26, 2006 || Catalina || CSS || — || align=right | 1.1 km || 
|-id=370 bgcolor=#E9E9E9
| 236370 ||  || — || January 26, 2006 || Mount Lemmon || Mount Lemmon Survey || HNS || align=right | 1.6 km || 
|-id=371 bgcolor=#fefefe
| 236371 ||  || — || January 30, 2006 || Kitt Peak || Spacewatch || — || align=right data-sort-value="0.82" | 820 m || 
|-id=372 bgcolor=#d6d6d6
| 236372 ||  || — || January 26, 2006 || Kitt Peak || Spacewatch || — || align=right | 4.1 km || 
|-id=373 bgcolor=#fefefe
| 236373 ||  || — || January 23, 2006 || Kitt Peak || Spacewatch || — || align=right | 1.3 km || 
|-id=374 bgcolor=#fefefe
| 236374 ||  || — || February 1, 2006 || Kitt Peak || Spacewatch || — || align=right | 1.3 km || 
|-id=375 bgcolor=#fefefe
| 236375 ||  || — || February 1, 2006 || Mount Lemmon || Mount Lemmon Survey || FLO || align=right | 1.1 km || 
|-id=376 bgcolor=#fefefe
| 236376 ||  || — || February 1, 2006 || Kitt Peak || Spacewatch || NYS || align=right data-sort-value="0.78" | 780 m || 
|-id=377 bgcolor=#fefefe
| 236377 ||  || — || February 1, 2006 || Mount Lemmon || Mount Lemmon Survey || V || align=right | 1.0 km || 
|-id=378 bgcolor=#E9E9E9
| 236378 ||  || — || February 1, 2006 || Kitt Peak || Spacewatch || — || align=right | 2.1 km || 
|-id=379 bgcolor=#E9E9E9
| 236379 ||  || — || February 2, 2006 || Kitt Peak || Spacewatch || — || align=right | 2.8 km || 
|-id=380 bgcolor=#d6d6d6
| 236380 ||  || — || February 6, 2006 || Catalina || CSS || — || align=right | 3.5 km || 
|-id=381 bgcolor=#fefefe
| 236381 ||  || — || February 6, 2006 || Mount Lemmon || Mount Lemmon Survey || — || align=right | 1.2 km || 
|-id=382 bgcolor=#E9E9E9
| 236382 ||  || — || February 6, 2006 || Kitt Peak || Spacewatch || — || align=right | 2.5 km || 
|-id=383 bgcolor=#fefefe
| 236383 ||  || — || February 20, 2006 || Catalina || CSS || — || align=right | 1.4 km || 
|-id=384 bgcolor=#E9E9E9
| 236384 ||  || — || February 22, 2006 || Catalina || CSS || — || align=right | 3.1 km || 
|-id=385 bgcolor=#E9E9E9
| 236385 ||  || — || February 23, 2006 || Powell || R. Trentman || HOF || align=right | 3.4 km || 
|-id=386 bgcolor=#fefefe
| 236386 ||  || — || February 20, 2006 || Kitt Peak || Spacewatch || — || align=right | 1.2 km || 
|-id=387 bgcolor=#E9E9E9
| 236387 ||  || — || February 20, 2006 || Catalina || CSS || EUN || align=right | 1.5 km || 
|-id=388 bgcolor=#E9E9E9
| 236388 ||  || — || February 20, 2006 || Kitt Peak || Spacewatch || — || align=right data-sort-value="0.93" | 930 m || 
|-id=389 bgcolor=#E9E9E9
| 236389 ||  || — || February 20, 2006 || Kitt Peak || Spacewatch || — || align=right | 2.0 km || 
|-id=390 bgcolor=#E9E9E9
| 236390 ||  || — || February 20, 2006 || Mount Lemmon || Mount Lemmon Survey || — || align=right | 1.4 km || 
|-id=391 bgcolor=#fefefe
| 236391 ||  || — || February 20, 2006 || Mount Lemmon || Mount Lemmon Survey || MAS || align=right data-sort-value="0.94" | 940 m || 
|-id=392 bgcolor=#d6d6d6
| 236392 ||  || — || February 20, 2006 || Mount Lemmon || Mount Lemmon Survey || BRA || align=right | 2.4 km || 
|-id=393 bgcolor=#FA8072
| 236393 ||  || — || February 20, 2006 || Kitt Peak || Spacewatch || — || align=right | 2.6 km || 
|-id=394 bgcolor=#fefefe
| 236394 ||  || — || February 21, 2006 || Anderson Mesa || LONEOS || — || align=right | 1.2 km || 
|-id=395 bgcolor=#E9E9E9
| 236395 ||  || — || February 21, 2006 || Mount Lemmon || Mount Lemmon Survey || — || align=right | 2.3 km || 
|-id=396 bgcolor=#E9E9E9
| 236396 ||  || — || February 20, 2006 || Kitt Peak || Spacewatch || BRU || align=right | 3.6 km || 
|-id=397 bgcolor=#E9E9E9
| 236397 ||  || — || February 24, 2006 || Catalina || CSS || — || align=right | 2.9 km || 
|-id=398 bgcolor=#E9E9E9
| 236398 ||  || — || February 24, 2006 || Kitt Peak || Spacewatch || — || align=right | 1.0 km || 
|-id=399 bgcolor=#E9E9E9
| 236399 ||  || — || February 24, 2006 || Mount Lemmon || Mount Lemmon Survey || — || align=right | 1.8 km || 
|-id=400 bgcolor=#E9E9E9
| 236400 ||  || — || February 24, 2006 || Kitt Peak || Spacewatch || HEN || align=right | 1.2 km || 
|}

236401–236500 

|-bgcolor=#fefefe
| 236401 ||  || — || February 21, 2006 || Catalina || CSS || — || align=right | 1.9 km || 
|-id=402 bgcolor=#E9E9E9
| 236402 ||  || — || February 22, 2006 || Anderson Mesa || LONEOS || — || align=right | 4.8 km || 
|-id=403 bgcolor=#d6d6d6
| 236403 ||  || — || February 20, 2006 || Catalina || CSS || NAE || align=right | 4.3 km || 
|-id=404 bgcolor=#fefefe
| 236404 ||  || — || February 20, 2006 || Catalina || CSS || — || align=right data-sort-value="0.98" | 980 m || 
|-id=405 bgcolor=#fefefe
| 236405 ||  || — || February 22, 2006 || Socorro || LINEAR || V || align=right | 1.00 km || 
|-id=406 bgcolor=#E9E9E9
| 236406 ||  || — || February 22, 2006 || Mount Lemmon || Mount Lemmon Survey || — || align=right | 4.7 km || 
|-id=407 bgcolor=#E9E9E9
| 236407 ||  || — || February 23, 2006 || Kitt Peak || Spacewatch || ADE || align=right | 2.6 km || 
|-id=408 bgcolor=#E9E9E9
| 236408 ||  || — || February 23, 2006 || Anderson Mesa || LONEOS || WAT || align=right | 3.0 km || 
|-id=409 bgcolor=#E9E9E9
| 236409 ||  || — || February 24, 2006 || Kitt Peak || Spacewatch || — || align=right | 1.7 km || 
|-id=410 bgcolor=#E9E9E9
| 236410 ||  || — || February 24, 2006 || Kitt Peak || Spacewatch || — || align=right | 1.3 km || 
|-id=411 bgcolor=#E9E9E9
| 236411 ||  || — || February 24, 2006 || Kitt Peak || Spacewatch || — || align=right | 1.4 km || 
|-id=412 bgcolor=#E9E9E9
| 236412 ||  || — || February 24, 2006 || Kitt Peak || Spacewatch || EUN || align=right | 1.5 km || 
|-id=413 bgcolor=#E9E9E9
| 236413 ||  || — || February 24, 2006 || Kitt Peak || Spacewatch || — || align=right | 1.7 km || 
|-id=414 bgcolor=#fefefe
| 236414 ||  || — || February 24, 2006 || Kitt Peak || Spacewatch || NYS || align=right data-sort-value="0.95" | 950 m || 
|-id=415 bgcolor=#E9E9E9
| 236415 ||  || — || February 24, 2006 || Kitt Peak || Spacewatch || — || align=right | 1.0 km || 
|-id=416 bgcolor=#E9E9E9
| 236416 ||  || — || February 24, 2006 || Kitt Peak || Spacewatch || — || align=right | 1.2 km || 
|-id=417 bgcolor=#E9E9E9
| 236417 ||  || — || February 24, 2006 || Kitt Peak || Spacewatch || — || align=right | 2.4 km || 
|-id=418 bgcolor=#E9E9E9
| 236418 ||  || — || February 24, 2006 || Kitt Peak || Spacewatch || — || align=right | 1.6 km || 
|-id=419 bgcolor=#E9E9E9
| 236419 ||  || — || February 24, 2006 || Kitt Peak || Spacewatch || — || align=right | 1.0 km || 
|-id=420 bgcolor=#E9E9E9
| 236420 ||  || — || February 24, 2006 || Kitt Peak || Spacewatch || — || align=right | 1.6 km || 
|-id=421 bgcolor=#E9E9E9
| 236421 ||  || — || February 24, 2006 || Kitt Peak || Spacewatch || — || align=right | 1.6 km || 
|-id=422 bgcolor=#E9E9E9
| 236422 ||  || — || February 24, 2006 || Mount Lemmon || Mount Lemmon Survey || — || align=right | 1.9 km || 
|-id=423 bgcolor=#E9E9E9
| 236423 ||  || — || February 25, 2006 || Kitt Peak || Spacewatch || — || align=right | 1.3 km || 
|-id=424 bgcolor=#fefefe
| 236424 ||  || — || February 25, 2006 || Mount Lemmon || Mount Lemmon Survey || — || align=right | 1.1 km || 
|-id=425 bgcolor=#fefefe
| 236425 ||  || — || February 25, 2006 || Mount Lemmon || Mount Lemmon Survey || MAS || align=right | 1.3 km || 
|-id=426 bgcolor=#E9E9E9
| 236426 ||  || — || February 27, 2006 || Kitt Peak || Spacewatch || — || align=right | 1.4 km || 
|-id=427 bgcolor=#E9E9E9
| 236427 ||  || — || February 27, 2006 || Kitt Peak || Spacewatch || — || align=right | 2.0 km || 
|-id=428 bgcolor=#E9E9E9
| 236428 ||  || — || February 27, 2006 || Kitt Peak || Spacewatch || HEN || align=right | 1.2 km || 
|-id=429 bgcolor=#fefefe
| 236429 ||  || — || February 20, 2006 || Socorro || LINEAR || — || align=right | 1.2 km || 
|-id=430 bgcolor=#E9E9E9
| 236430 ||  || — || February 22, 2006 || Catalina || CSS || — || align=right | 1.8 km || 
|-id=431 bgcolor=#E9E9E9
| 236431 ||  || — || February 25, 2006 || Kitt Peak || Spacewatch || — || align=right | 1.4 km || 
|-id=432 bgcolor=#E9E9E9
| 236432 ||  || — || February 25, 2006 || Kitt Peak || Spacewatch || — || align=right | 2.1 km || 
|-id=433 bgcolor=#E9E9E9
| 236433 ||  || — || February 25, 2006 || Mount Lemmon || Mount Lemmon Survey || — || align=right data-sort-value="0.82" | 820 m || 
|-id=434 bgcolor=#fefefe
| 236434 ||  || — || February 25, 2006 || Kitt Peak || Spacewatch || — || align=right | 1.2 km || 
|-id=435 bgcolor=#E9E9E9
| 236435 ||  || — || February 25, 2006 || Kitt Peak || Spacewatch || — || align=right | 1.7 km || 
|-id=436 bgcolor=#E9E9E9
| 236436 ||  || — || February 25, 2006 || Kitt Peak || Spacewatch || — || align=right | 3.7 km || 
|-id=437 bgcolor=#E9E9E9
| 236437 ||  || — || February 27, 2006 || Kitt Peak || Spacewatch || — || align=right | 3.0 km || 
|-id=438 bgcolor=#E9E9E9
| 236438 ||  || — || February 27, 2006 || Kitt Peak || Spacewatch || — || align=right | 1.4 km || 
|-id=439 bgcolor=#E9E9E9
| 236439 ||  || — || February 27, 2006 || Kitt Peak || Spacewatch || — || align=right | 1.3 km || 
|-id=440 bgcolor=#E9E9E9
| 236440 ||  || — || February 27, 2006 || Kitt Peak || Spacewatch || — || align=right data-sort-value="0.88" | 880 m || 
|-id=441 bgcolor=#E9E9E9
| 236441 ||  || — || February 24, 2006 || Catalina || CSS || EUN || align=right | 1.8 km || 
|-id=442 bgcolor=#fefefe
| 236442 ||  || — || February 23, 2006 || Anderson Mesa || LONEOS || PHO || align=right | 1.7 km || 
|-id=443 bgcolor=#E9E9E9
| 236443 ||  || — || February 24, 2006 || Catalina || CSS || — || align=right | 3.1 km || 
|-id=444 bgcolor=#E9E9E9
| 236444 ||  || — || February 24, 2006 || Catalina || CSS || — || align=right | 2.0 km || 
|-id=445 bgcolor=#E9E9E9
| 236445 ||  || — || February 25, 2006 || Mount Lemmon || Mount Lemmon Survey || MAR || align=right | 1.2 km || 
|-id=446 bgcolor=#E9E9E9
| 236446 ||  || — || February 25, 2006 || Kitt Peak || Spacewatch || — || align=right | 2.3 km || 
|-id=447 bgcolor=#E9E9E9
| 236447 ||  || — || February 25, 2006 || Kitt Peak || Spacewatch || — || align=right | 1.7 km || 
|-id=448 bgcolor=#d6d6d6
| 236448 ||  || — || February 24, 2006 || Kitt Peak || Spacewatch || — || align=right | 3.9 km || 
|-id=449 bgcolor=#E9E9E9
| 236449 ||  || — || February 25, 2006 || Kitt Peak || Spacewatch || EUN || align=right | 1.8 km || 
|-id=450 bgcolor=#E9E9E9
| 236450 ||  || — || March 2, 2006 || Kitt Peak || Spacewatch || — || align=right | 2.4 km || 
|-id=451 bgcolor=#E9E9E9
| 236451 ||  || — || March 2, 2006 || Kitt Peak || Spacewatch || — || align=right | 1.2 km || 
|-id=452 bgcolor=#E9E9E9
| 236452 ||  || — || March 2, 2006 || Mount Lemmon || Mount Lemmon Survey || — || align=right | 1.9 km || 
|-id=453 bgcolor=#E9E9E9
| 236453 ||  || — || March 3, 2006 || Kitt Peak || Spacewatch || — || align=right | 2.7 km || 
|-id=454 bgcolor=#E9E9E9
| 236454 ||  || — || March 3, 2006 || Kitt Peak || Spacewatch || — || align=right | 1.5 km || 
|-id=455 bgcolor=#E9E9E9
| 236455 ||  || — || March 3, 2006 || Mount Lemmon || Mount Lemmon Survey || — || align=right | 2.3 km || 
|-id=456 bgcolor=#fefefe
| 236456 ||  || — || March 4, 2006 || Mount Lemmon || Mount Lemmon Survey || LCI || align=right | 1.8 km || 
|-id=457 bgcolor=#E9E9E9
| 236457 ||  || — || March 5, 2006 || Kitt Peak || Spacewatch || — || align=right | 2.3 km || 
|-id=458 bgcolor=#E9E9E9
| 236458 ||  || — || March 5, 2006 || Kitt Peak || Spacewatch || MAR || align=right | 1.7 km || 
|-id=459 bgcolor=#fefefe
| 236459 ||  || — || March 5, 2006 || Kitt Peak || Spacewatch || — || align=right | 1.3 km || 
|-id=460 bgcolor=#E9E9E9
| 236460 ||  || — || March 5, 2006 || Kitt Peak || Spacewatch || — || align=right | 2.5 km || 
|-id=461 bgcolor=#E9E9E9
| 236461 ||  || — || March 6, 2006 || Kitt Peak || Spacewatch || — || align=right | 1.8 km || 
|-id=462 bgcolor=#E9E9E9
| 236462 ||  || — || March 5, 2006 || Kitt Peak || Spacewatch || — || align=right | 1.1 km || 
|-id=463 bgcolor=#E9E9E9
| 236463 Bretécher ||  ||  || March 18, 2006 || Nogales || J.-C. Merlin || — || align=right | 1.1 km || 
|-id=464 bgcolor=#E9E9E9
| 236464 ||  || — || March 22, 2006 || Catalina || CSS || — || align=right | 1.8 km || 
|-id=465 bgcolor=#E9E9E9
| 236465 ||  || — || March 21, 2006 || Mount Lemmon || Mount Lemmon Survey || — || align=right | 2.3 km || 
|-id=466 bgcolor=#E9E9E9
| 236466 ||  || — || March 21, 2006 || Mount Lemmon || Mount Lemmon Survey || — || align=right | 3.9 km || 
|-id=467 bgcolor=#E9E9E9
| 236467 ||  || — || March 23, 2006 || Kitt Peak || Spacewatch || — || align=right | 2.8 km || 
|-id=468 bgcolor=#E9E9E9
| 236468 ||  || — || March 23, 2006 || Kitt Peak || Spacewatch || — || align=right | 1.9 km || 
|-id=469 bgcolor=#E9E9E9
| 236469 ||  || — || March 23, 2006 || Mount Lemmon || Mount Lemmon Survey || — || align=right | 1.7 km || 
|-id=470 bgcolor=#E9E9E9
| 236470 ||  || — || March 23, 2006 || Kitt Peak || Spacewatch || — || align=right | 2.7 km || 
|-id=471 bgcolor=#E9E9E9
| 236471 ||  || — || March 23, 2006 || Kitt Peak || Spacewatch || — || align=right | 2.1 km || 
|-id=472 bgcolor=#E9E9E9
| 236472 ||  || — || March 23, 2006 || Kitt Peak || Spacewatch || — || align=right | 2.6 km || 
|-id=473 bgcolor=#E9E9E9
| 236473 ||  || — || March 23, 2006 || Kitt Peak || Spacewatch || MIS || align=right | 3.5 km || 
|-id=474 bgcolor=#E9E9E9
| 236474 ||  || — || March 23, 2006 || Mount Lemmon || Mount Lemmon Survey || — || align=right | 4.9 km || 
|-id=475 bgcolor=#E9E9E9
| 236475 ||  || — || March 24, 2006 || Bergisch Gladbac || W. Bickel || — || align=right | 1.5 km || 
|-id=476 bgcolor=#E9E9E9
| 236476 ||  || — || March 24, 2006 || Kitt Peak || Spacewatch || — || align=right | 3.3 km || 
|-id=477 bgcolor=#E9E9E9
| 236477 ||  || — || March 24, 2006 || Kitt Peak || Spacewatch || — || align=right | 1.7 km || 
|-id=478 bgcolor=#E9E9E9
| 236478 ||  || — || March 24, 2006 || Mount Lemmon || Mount Lemmon Survey || — || align=right | 2.3 km || 
|-id=479 bgcolor=#fefefe
| 236479 ||  || — || March 25, 2006 || Kitt Peak || Spacewatch || — || align=right | 2.3 km || 
|-id=480 bgcolor=#E9E9E9
| 236480 ||  || — || March 25, 2006 || Mount Lemmon || Mount Lemmon Survey || — || align=right | 3.2 km || 
|-id=481 bgcolor=#E9E9E9
| 236481 ||  || — || March 24, 2006 || Catalina || CSS || BRG || align=right | 2.3 km || 
|-id=482 bgcolor=#E9E9E9
| 236482 ||  || — || March 24, 2006 || Siding Spring || SSS || MIT || align=right | 3.8 km || 
|-id=483 bgcolor=#E9E9E9
| 236483 ||  || — || March 25, 2006 || Palomar || NEAT || EUN || align=right | 2.2 km || 
|-id=484 bgcolor=#E9E9E9
| 236484 Luchijen ||  ||  || March 28, 2006 || Lulin Observatory || H.-C. Lin, Q.-z. Ye || — || align=right | 1.7 km || 
|-id=485 bgcolor=#E9E9E9
| 236485 ||  || — || March 25, 2006 || Mount Lemmon || Mount Lemmon Survey || — || align=right | 3.3 km || 
|-id=486 bgcolor=#E9E9E9
| 236486 ||  || — || March 21, 2006 || Socorro || LINEAR || — || align=right | 3.2 km || 
|-id=487 bgcolor=#fefefe
| 236487 ||  || — || March 26, 2006 || Kitt Peak || Spacewatch || MAS || align=right data-sort-value="0.93" | 930 m || 
|-id=488 bgcolor=#E9E9E9
| 236488 ||  || — || March 26, 2006 || Kitt Peak || Spacewatch || — || align=right | 2.1 km || 
|-id=489 bgcolor=#E9E9E9
| 236489 ||  || — || March 23, 2006 || Kitt Peak || Spacewatch || RAF || align=right | 1.5 km || 
|-id=490 bgcolor=#E9E9E9
| 236490 ||  || — || March 26, 2006 || Mount Lemmon || Mount Lemmon Survey || — || align=right | 2.0 km || 
|-id=491 bgcolor=#E9E9E9
| 236491 ||  || — || April 2, 2006 || Reedy Creek || J. Broughton || — || align=right | 2.1 km || 
|-id=492 bgcolor=#E9E9E9
| 236492 ||  || — || April 7, 2006 || Ottmarsheim || C. Rinner || — || align=right | 2.7 km || 
|-id=493 bgcolor=#E9E9E9
| 236493 ||  || — || April 2, 2006 || Kitt Peak || Spacewatch || — || align=right | 1.4 km || 
|-id=494 bgcolor=#E9E9E9
| 236494 ||  || — || April 2, 2006 || Kitt Peak || Spacewatch || — || align=right | 1.3 km || 
|-id=495 bgcolor=#E9E9E9
| 236495 ||  || — || April 2, 2006 || Kitt Peak || Spacewatch || — || align=right | 2.5 km || 
|-id=496 bgcolor=#E9E9E9
| 236496 ||  || — || April 2, 2006 || Kitt Peak || Spacewatch || — || align=right | 2.0 km || 
|-id=497 bgcolor=#E9E9E9
| 236497 ||  || — || April 2, 2006 || Kitt Peak || Spacewatch || — || align=right | 1.7 km || 
|-id=498 bgcolor=#E9E9E9
| 236498 ||  || — || April 2, 2006 || Kitt Peak || Spacewatch || — || align=right | 1.4 km || 
|-id=499 bgcolor=#E9E9E9
| 236499 ||  || — || April 2, 2006 || Mount Lemmon || Mount Lemmon Survey || — || align=right | 1.4 km || 
|-id=500 bgcolor=#E9E9E9
| 236500 ||  || — || April 2, 2006 || Kitt Peak || Spacewatch || AEO || align=right | 1.8 km || 
|}

236501–236600 

|-bgcolor=#E9E9E9
| 236501 ||  || — || April 2, 2006 || Kitt Peak || Spacewatch || — || align=right | 1.6 km || 
|-id=502 bgcolor=#E9E9E9
| 236502 ||  || — || April 2, 2006 || Kitt Peak || Spacewatch || RAF || align=right | 1.6 km || 
|-id=503 bgcolor=#E9E9E9
| 236503 ||  || — || April 2, 2006 || Mount Lemmon || Mount Lemmon Survey || WIT || align=right | 1.2 km || 
|-id=504 bgcolor=#E9E9E9
| 236504 ||  || — || April 2, 2006 || Kitt Peak || Spacewatch || — || align=right | 3.1 km || 
|-id=505 bgcolor=#d6d6d6
| 236505 ||  || — || April 7, 2006 || Catalina || CSS || — || align=right | 5.8 km || 
|-id=506 bgcolor=#E9E9E9
| 236506 ||  || — || April 8, 2006 || Kitt Peak || Spacewatch || — || align=right | 3.4 km || 
|-id=507 bgcolor=#E9E9E9
| 236507 ||  || — || April 8, 2006 || Kitt Peak || Spacewatch || — || align=right | 1.3 km || 
|-id=508 bgcolor=#E9E9E9
| 236508 ||  || — || April 4, 2006 || Črni Vrh || Črni Vrh || GER || align=right | 4.2 km || 
|-id=509 bgcolor=#d6d6d6
| 236509 ||  || — || April 7, 2006 || Catalina || CSS || — || align=right | 6.4 km || 
|-id=510 bgcolor=#E9E9E9
| 236510 ||  || — || April 13, 2006 || Palomar || NEAT || — || align=right | 2.8 km || 
|-id=511 bgcolor=#E9E9E9
| 236511 ||  || — || April 7, 2006 || Kitt Peak || Spacewatch || — || align=right | 2.7 km || 
|-id=512 bgcolor=#E9E9E9
| 236512 ||  || — || April 8, 2006 || Kitt Peak || Spacewatch || MIS || align=right | 1.8 km || 
|-id=513 bgcolor=#E9E9E9
| 236513 ||  || — || April 9, 2006 || Kitt Peak || Spacewatch || — || align=right | 1.9 km || 
|-id=514 bgcolor=#E9E9E9
| 236514 ||  || — || April 9, 2006 || Kitt Peak || Spacewatch || — || align=right | 1.7 km || 
|-id=515 bgcolor=#E9E9E9
| 236515 ||  || — || April 9, 2006 || Kitt Peak || Spacewatch || — || align=right | 2.8 km || 
|-id=516 bgcolor=#E9E9E9
| 236516 ||  || — || April 9, 2006 || Kitt Peak || Spacewatch || — || align=right | 3.2 km || 
|-id=517 bgcolor=#d6d6d6
| 236517 ||  || — || April 2, 2006 || Catalina || CSS || — || align=right | 5.9 km || 
|-id=518 bgcolor=#E9E9E9
| 236518 ||  || — || April 9, 2006 || Catalina || CSS || EUN || align=right | 2.6 km || 
|-id=519 bgcolor=#E9E9E9
| 236519 ||  || — || April 8, 2006 || Anderson Mesa || LONEOS || — || align=right | 1.9 km || 
|-id=520 bgcolor=#E9E9E9
| 236520 ||  || — || April 18, 2006 || Kitt Peak || Spacewatch || — || align=right | 1.0 km || 
|-id=521 bgcolor=#E9E9E9
| 236521 ||  || — || April 18, 2006 || Kitt Peak || Spacewatch || WIT || align=right | 1.2 km || 
|-id=522 bgcolor=#E9E9E9
| 236522 ||  || — || April 19, 2006 || Anderson Mesa || LONEOS || — || align=right | 1.9 km || 
|-id=523 bgcolor=#E9E9E9
| 236523 ||  || — || April 19, 2006 || Mount Lemmon || Mount Lemmon Survey || — || align=right | 1.9 km || 
|-id=524 bgcolor=#E9E9E9
| 236524 ||  || — || April 19, 2006 || Kitt Peak || Spacewatch || JUN || align=right | 1.3 km || 
|-id=525 bgcolor=#d6d6d6
| 236525 ||  || — || April 19, 2006 || Kitt Peak || Spacewatch || — || align=right | 6.0 km || 
|-id=526 bgcolor=#E9E9E9
| 236526 ||  || — || April 19, 2006 || Kitt Peak || Spacewatch || — || align=right | 2.0 km || 
|-id=527 bgcolor=#E9E9E9
| 236527 ||  || — || April 19, 2006 || Kitt Peak || Spacewatch || WIT || align=right | 1.5 km || 
|-id=528 bgcolor=#E9E9E9
| 236528 ||  || — || April 19, 2006 || Kitt Peak || Spacewatch || — || align=right | 1.9 km || 
|-id=529 bgcolor=#fefefe
| 236529 ||  || — || April 19, 2006 || Palomar || NEAT || ERI || align=right | 3.1 km || 
|-id=530 bgcolor=#E9E9E9
| 236530 ||  || — || April 20, 2006 || Kitt Peak || Spacewatch || — || align=right | 3.2 km || 
|-id=531 bgcolor=#E9E9E9
| 236531 ||  || — || April 18, 2006 || Kitt Peak || Spacewatch || — || align=right | 1.2 km || 
|-id=532 bgcolor=#E9E9E9
| 236532 ||  || — || April 20, 2006 || Kitt Peak || Spacewatch || — || align=right | 3.0 km || 
|-id=533 bgcolor=#E9E9E9
| 236533 ||  || — || April 20, 2006 || Kitt Peak || Spacewatch || HOF || align=right | 3.6 km || 
|-id=534 bgcolor=#d6d6d6
| 236534 ||  || — || April 21, 2006 || Catalina || CSS || — || align=right | 4.1 km || 
|-id=535 bgcolor=#E9E9E9
| 236535 ||  || — || April 20, 2006 || Catalina || CSS || — || align=right | 2.2 km || 
|-id=536 bgcolor=#E9E9E9
| 236536 ||  || — || April 19, 2006 || Catalina || CSS || — || align=right | 1.5 km || 
|-id=537 bgcolor=#E9E9E9
| 236537 ||  || — || April 19, 2006 || Mount Lemmon || Mount Lemmon Survey || — || align=right | 1.9 km || 
|-id=538 bgcolor=#E9E9E9
| 236538 ||  || — || April 21, 2006 || Kitt Peak || Spacewatch || — || align=right | 2.3 km || 
|-id=539 bgcolor=#E9E9E9
| 236539 ||  || — || April 21, 2006 || Kitt Peak || Spacewatch || AGN || align=right | 1.7 km || 
|-id=540 bgcolor=#E9E9E9
| 236540 ||  || — || April 21, 2006 || Kitt Peak || Spacewatch || — || align=right | 2.3 km || 
|-id=541 bgcolor=#E9E9E9
| 236541 ||  || — || April 23, 2006 || Socorro || LINEAR || — || align=right | 1.3 km || 
|-id=542 bgcolor=#E9E9E9
| 236542 ||  || — || April 24, 2006 || Mount Lemmon || Mount Lemmon Survey || — || align=right | 2.6 km || 
|-id=543 bgcolor=#E9E9E9
| 236543 ||  || — || April 25, 2006 || Kitt Peak || Spacewatch || — || align=right | 1.3 km || 
|-id=544 bgcolor=#E9E9E9
| 236544 ||  || — || April 25, 2006 || Catalina || CSS || EUN || align=right | 2.1 km || 
|-id=545 bgcolor=#E9E9E9
| 236545 ||  || — || April 20, 2006 || Kitt Peak || Spacewatch || — || align=right | 2.0 km || 
|-id=546 bgcolor=#E9E9E9
| 236546 ||  || — || April 21, 2006 || Catalina || CSS || EUN || align=right | 1.8 km || 
|-id=547 bgcolor=#E9E9E9
| 236547 ||  || — || April 21, 2006 || Catalina || CSS || — || align=right | 3.2 km || 
|-id=548 bgcolor=#E9E9E9
| 236548 ||  || — || April 24, 2006 || Anderson Mesa || LONEOS || — || align=right | 2.1 km || 
|-id=549 bgcolor=#E9E9E9
| 236549 ||  || — || April 24, 2006 || Reedy Creek || J. Broughton || — || align=right | 3.4 km || 
|-id=550 bgcolor=#E9E9E9
| 236550 ||  || — || April 26, 2006 || Reedy Creek || J. Broughton || ADE || align=right | 3.7 km || 
|-id=551 bgcolor=#E9E9E9
| 236551 ||  || — || April 18, 2006 || Catalina || CSS || — || align=right | 2.0 km || 
|-id=552 bgcolor=#E9E9E9
| 236552 ||  || — || April 21, 2006 || Catalina || CSS || ADE || align=right | 3.0 km || 
|-id=553 bgcolor=#E9E9E9
| 236553 ||  || — || April 21, 2006 || Catalina || CSS || ADE || align=right | 3.5 km || 
|-id=554 bgcolor=#E9E9E9
| 236554 ||  || — || April 21, 2006 || Siding Spring || SSS || ADE || align=right | 4.5 km || 
|-id=555 bgcolor=#E9E9E9
| 236555 ||  || — || April 21, 2006 || Siding Spring || SSS || — || align=right | 3.8 km || 
|-id=556 bgcolor=#E9E9E9
| 236556 ||  || — || April 24, 2006 || Anderson Mesa || LONEOS || — || align=right | 2.9 km || 
|-id=557 bgcolor=#E9E9E9
| 236557 ||  || — || April 24, 2006 || Kitt Peak || Spacewatch || HOF || align=right | 3.0 km || 
|-id=558 bgcolor=#d6d6d6
| 236558 ||  || — || April 24, 2006 || Kitt Peak || Spacewatch || — || align=right | 3.2 km || 
|-id=559 bgcolor=#E9E9E9
| 236559 ||  || — || April 24, 2006 || Mount Lemmon || Mount Lemmon Survey || — || align=right | 2.6 km || 
|-id=560 bgcolor=#E9E9E9
| 236560 ||  || — || April 24, 2006 || Anderson Mesa || LONEOS || — || align=right | 3.4 km || 
|-id=561 bgcolor=#E9E9E9
| 236561 ||  || — || April 25, 2006 || Catalina || CSS || EUN || align=right | 2.3 km || 
|-id=562 bgcolor=#E9E9E9
| 236562 ||  || — || April 25, 2006 || Kitt Peak || Spacewatch || EUN || align=right | 1.7 km || 
|-id=563 bgcolor=#E9E9E9
| 236563 ||  || — || April 26, 2006 || Mount Lemmon || Mount Lemmon Survey || — || align=right | 3.5 km || 
|-id=564 bgcolor=#E9E9E9
| 236564 ||  || — || April 26, 2006 || Kitt Peak || Spacewatch || AST || align=right | 2.9 km || 
|-id=565 bgcolor=#E9E9E9
| 236565 ||  || — || April 26, 2006 || Kitt Peak || Spacewatch || — || align=right | 1.2 km || 
|-id=566 bgcolor=#E9E9E9
| 236566 ||  || — || April 26, 2006 || Kitt Peak || Spacewatch || — || align=right | 3.2 km || 
|-id=567 bgcolor=#d6d6d6
| 236567 ||  || — || April 27, 2006 || Kitt Peak || Spacewatch || — || align=right | 4.9 km || 
|-id=568 bgcolor=#E9E9E9
| 236568 ||  || — || April 27, 2006 || Socorro || LINEAR || — || align=right | 2.0 km || 
|-id=569 bgcolor=#E9E9E9
| 236569 ||  || — || April 30, 2006 || Kitt Peak || Spacewatch || — || align=right | 2.8 km || 
|-id=570 bgcolor=#E9E9E9
| 236570 ||  || — || April 20, 2006 || Anderson Mesa || LONEOS || — || align=right | 2.1 km || 
|-id=571 bgcolor=#E9E9E9
| 236571 ||  || — || April 29, 2006 || Kitt Peak || Spacewatch || NEM || align=right | 2.8 km || 
|-id=572 bgcolor=#E9E9E9
| 236572 ||  || — || April 29, 2006 || Kitt Peak || Spacewatch || — || align=right | 1.8 km || 
|-id=573 bgcolor=#E9E9E9
| 236573 ||  || — || April 29, 2006 || Kitt Peak || Spacewatch || — || align=right | 2.1 km || 
|-id=574 bgcolor=#d6d6d6
| 236574 ||  || — || April 29, 2006 || Kitt Peak || Spacewatch || CHA || align=right | 2.3 km || 
|-id=575 bgcolor=#E9E9E9
| 236575 ||  || — || April 30, 2006 || Kitt Peak || Spacewatch || — || align=right | 3.6 km || 
|-id=576 bgcolor=#E9E9E9
| 236576 ||  || — || April 30, 2006 || Kitt Peak || Spacewatch || WIT || align=right data-sort-value="0.96" | 960 m || 
|-id=577 bgcolor=#E9E9E9
| 236577 ||  || — || April 30, 2006 || Kitt Peak || Spacewatch || AGN || align=right | 1.3 km || 
|-id=578 bgcolor=#E9E9E9
| 236578 ||  || — || April 30, 2006 || Kitt Peak || Spacewatch || — || align=right | 2.8 km || 
|-id=579 bgcolor=#E9E9E9
| 236579 ||  || — || April 30, 2006 || Kitt Peak || Spacewatch || — || align=right | 3.0 km || 
|-id=580 bgcolor=#E9E9E9
| 236580 ||  || — || April 30, 2006 || Kitt Peak || Spacewatch || AGN || align=right | 1.2 km || 
|-id=581 bgcolor=#E9E9E9
| 236581 ||  || — || April 30, 2006 || Kitt Peak || Spacewatch || — || align=right | 2.2 km || 
|-id=582 bgcolor=#E9E9E9
| 236582 ||  || — || April 19, 2006 || Anderson Mesa || LONEOS || RAF || align=right | 1.4 km || 
|-id=583 bgcolor=#E9E9E9
| 236583 ||  || — || April 29, 2006 || Siding Spring || SSS || — || align=right | 2.4 km || 
|-id=584 bgcolor=#E9E9E9
| 236584 ||  || — || April 30, 2006 || Kitt Peak || Spacewatch || NEM || align=right | 3.4 km || 
|-id=585 bgcolor=#E9E9E9
| 236585 ||  || — || April 29, 2006 || Siding Spring || SSS || — || align=right | 2.9 km || 
|-id=586 bgcolor=#E9E9E9
| 236586 ||  || — || April 29, 2006 || Kitt Peak || Spacewatch || AGN || align=right | 1.4 km || 
|-id=587 bgcolor=#E9E9E9
| 236587 ||  || — || April 30, 2006 || Kitt Peak || Spacewatch || PAD || align=right | 1.8 km || 
|-id=588 bgcolor=#E9E9E9
| 236588 ||  || — || April 30, 2006 || Kitt Peak || Spacewatch || — || align=right | 2.3 km || 
|-id=589 bgcolor=#E9E9E9
| 236589 ||  || — || April 30, 2006 || Kitt Peak || Spacewatch || — || align=right | 3.1 km || 
|-id=590 bgcolor=#E9E9E9
| 236590 ||  || — || April 30, 2006 || Catalina || CSS || MIT || align=right | 3.3 km || 
|-id=591 bgcolor=#d6d6d6
| 236591 ||  || — || April 30, 2006 || Catalina || CSS || — || align=right | 5.4 km || 
|-id=592 bgcolor=#E9E9E9
| 236592 ||  || — || April 29, 2006 || Siding Spring || SSS || — || align=right | 1.6 km || 
|-id=593 bgcolor=#E9E9E9
| 236593 ||  || — || April 26, 2006 || Kitt Peak || Spacewatch || — || align=right | 1.2 km || 
|-id=594 bgcolor=#E9E9E9
| 236594 ||  || — || May 2, 2006 || Mount Lemmon || Mount Lemmon Survey || — || align=right | 1.6 km || 
|-id=595 bgcolor=#E9E9E9
| 236595 ||  || — || May 2, 2006 || Mount Lemmon || Mount Lemmon Survey || — || align=right | 3.0 km || 
|-id=596 bgcolor=#d6d6d6
| 236596 ||  || — || May 3, 2006 || Mount Lemmon || Mount Lemmon Survey || KAR || align=right | 1.3 km || 
|-id=597 bgcolor=#E9E9E9
| 236597 ||  || — || May 2, 2006 || Nyukasa || Mount Nyukasa Stn. || — || align=right | 3.2 km || 
|-id=598 bgcolor=#E9E9E9
| 236598 ||  || — || May 1, 2006 || Kitt Peak || Spacewatch || DOR || align=right | 3.3 km || 
|-id=599 bgcolor=#E9E9E9
| 236599 ||  || — || May 1, 2006 || Kitt Peak || Spacewatch || — || align=right | 2.8 km || 
|-id=600 bgcolor=#E9E9E9
| 236600 ||  || — || May 2, 2006 || Mount Lemmon || Mount Lemmon Survey || HEN || align=right | 1.4 km || 
|}

236601–236700 

|-bgcolor=#d6d6d6
| 236601 ||  || — || May 2, 2006 || Kitt Peak || Spacewatch || TRE || align=right | 4.4 km || 
|-id=602 bgcolor=#E9E9E9
| 236602 ||  || — || May 2, 2006 || Mount Lemmon || Mount Lemmon Survey || AGN || align=right | 2.0 km || 
|-id=603 bgcolor=#E9E9E9
| 236603 ||  || — || May 2, 2006 || Mount Lemmon || Mount Lemmon Survey || — || align=right | 4.1 km || 
|-id=604 bgcolor=#d6d6d6
| 236604 ||  || — || May 2, 2006 || Mount Lemmon || Mount Lemmon Survey || — || align=right | 3.4 km || 
|-id=605 bgcolor=#E9E9E9
| 236605 ||  || — || May 3, 2006 || Kitt Peak || Spacewatch || — || align=right | 1.5 km || 
|-id=606 bgcolor=#E9E9E9
| 236606 ||  || — || May 3, 2006 || Kitt Peak || Spacewatch || HEN || align=right | 1.2 km || 
|-id=607 bgcolor=#d6d6d6
| 236607 ||  || — || May 4, 2006 || Kitt Peak || Spacewatch || — || align=right | 3.5 km || 
|-id=608 bgcolor=#d6d6d6
| 236608 ||  || — || May 6, 2006 || Mount Lemmon || Mount Lemmon Survey || KOR || align=right | 1.7 km || 
|-id=609 bgcolor=#E9E9E9
| 236609 ||  || — || May 7, 2006 || Mount Lemmon || Mount Lemmon Survey || — || align=right | 2.8 km || 
|-id=610 bgcolor=#E9E9E9
| 236610 ||  || — || May 2, 2006 || Kitt Peak || Spacewatch || — || align=right | 2.7 km || 
|-id=611 bgcolor=#E9E9E9
| 236611 ||  || — || May 2, 2006 || Kitt Peak || Spacewatch || — || align=right | 2.2 km || 
|-id=612 bgcolor=#d6d6d6
| 236612 ||  || — || May 6, 2006 || Kitt Peak || Spacewatch || — || align=right | 5.8 km || 
|-id=613 bgcolor=#E9E9E9
| 236613 ||  || — || May 7, 2006 || Mount Lemmon || Mount Lemmon Survey || — || align=right | 1.6 km || 
|-id=614 bgcolor=#E9E9E9
| 236614 ||  || — || May 9, 2006 || Mount Lemmon || Mount Lemmon Survey || — || align=right | 3.2 km || 
|-id=615 bgcolor=#E9E9E9
| 236615 ||  || — || May 5, 2006 || Kitt Peak || Spacewatch || — || align=right | 1.9 km || 
|-id=616 bgcolor=#E9E9E9
| 236616 Gray ||  ||  || May 1, 2006 || Mauna Kea || P. A. Wiegert || — || align=right | 1.9 km || 
|-id=617 bgcolor=#fefefe
| 236617 ||  || — || May 1, 2006 || Kitt Peak || M. W. Buie || MAS || align=right | 1.1 km || 
|-id=618 bgcolor=#d6d6d6
| 236618 ||  || — || May 8, 2006 || Mount Lemmon || Mount Lemmon Survey || CHA || align=right | 2.9 km || 
|-id=619 bgcolor=#E9E9E9
| 236619 ||  || — || May 16, 2006 || Palomar || NEAT || — || align=right | 4.2 km || 
|-id=620 bgcolor=#E9E9E9
| 236620 ||  || — || May 18, 2006 || Palomar || NEAT || — || align=right | 1.9 km || 
|-id=621 bgcolor=#E9E9E9
| 236621 ||  || — || May 21, 2006 || Reedy Creek || J. Broughton || — || align=right | 1.7 km || 
|-id=622 bgcolor=#E9E9E9
| 236622 ||  || — || May 17, 2006 || Palomar || NEAT || — || align=right | 2.1 km || 
|-id=623 bgcolor=#E9E9E9
| 236623 ||  || — || May 17, 2006 || Siding Spring || SSS || — || align=right | 2.9 km || 
|-id=624 bgcolor=#d6d6d6
| 236624 ||  || — || May 19, 2006 || Mount Lemmon || Mount Lemmon Survey || KOR || align=right | 1.5 km || 
|-id=625 bgcolor=#E9E9E9
| 236625 ||  || — || May 19, 2006 || Catalina || CSS || EUN || align=right | 1.8 km || 
|-id=626 bgcolor=#E9E9E9
| 236626 ||  || — || May 19, 2006 || Mount Lemmon || Mount Lemmon Survey || — || align=right | 2.6 km || 
|-id=627 bgcolor=#E9E9E9
| 236627 ||  || — || May 19, 2006 || Palomar || NEAT || — || align=right | 3.3 km || 
|-id=628 bgcolor=#E9E9E9
| 236628 ||  || — || May 20, 2006 || Catalina || CSS || — || align=right | 3.7 km || 
|-id=629 bgcolor=#E9E9E9
| 236629 ||  || — || May 21, 2006 || Kitt Peak || Spacewatch || — || align=right | 3.1 km || 
|-id=630 bgcolor=#E9E9E9
| 236630 ||  || — || May 18, 2006 || Palomar || NEAT || — || align=right | 2.4 km || 
|-id=631 bgcolor=#E9E9E9
| 236631 ||  || — || May 20, 2006 || Catalina || CSS || — || align=right | 3.5 km || 
|-id=632 bgcolor=#d6d6d6
| 236632 ||  || — || May 21, 2006 || Mount Lemmon || Mount Lemmon Survey || — || align=right | 4.8 km || 
|-id=633 bgcolor=#E9E9E9
| 236633 ||  || — || May 18, 2006 || Catalina || CSS || — || align=right | 2.6 km || 
|-id=634 bgcolor=#E9E9E9
| 236634 ||  || — || May 20, 2006 || Kitt Peak || Spacewatch || — || align=right | 3.2 km || 
|-id=635 bgcolor=#E9E9E9
| 236635 ||  || — || May 20, 2006 || Kitt Peak || Spacewatch || — || align=right | 3.1 km || 
|-id=636 bgcolor=#E9E9E9
| 236636 ||  || — || May 20, 2006 || Kitt Peak || Spacewatch || — || align=right | 1.5 km || 
|-id=637 bgcolor=#E9E9E9
| 236637 ||  || — || May 20, 2006 || Catalina || CSS || — || align=right | 3.2 km || 
|-id=638 bgcolor=#E9E9E9
| 236638 ||  || — || May 24, 2006 || Vail-Jarnac || Jarnac Obs. || EUN || align=right | 1.8 km || 
|-id=639 bgcolor=#E9E9E9
| 236639 ||  || — || May 18, 2006 || Siding Spring || SSS || EUN || align=right | 1.9 km || 
|-id=640 bgcolor=#E9E9E9
| 236640 ||  || — || May 20, 2006 || Anderson Mesa || LONEOS || ADE || align=right | 3.8 km || 
|-id=641 bgcolor=#E9E9E9
| 236641 ||  || — || May 19, 2006 || Mount Lemmon || Mount Lemmon Survey || — || align=right | 3.4 km || 
|-id=642 bgcolor=#d6d6d6
| 236642 ||  || — || May 20, 2006 || Kitt Peak || Spacewatch || KOR || align=right | 1.8 km || 
|-id=643 bgcolor=#E9E9E9
| 236643 ||  || — || May 21, 2006 || Mount Lemmon || Mount Lemmon Survey || — || align=right | 2.7 km || 
|-id=644 bgcolor=#E9E9E9
| 236644 ||  || — || May 21, 2006 || Kitt Peak || Spacewatch || — || align=right | 2.9 km || 
|-id=645 bgcolor=#d6d6d6
| 236645 ||  || — || May 21, 2006 || Mount Lemmon || Mount Lemmon Survey || — || align=right | 2.7 km || 
|-id=646 bgcolor=#E9E9E9
| 236646 ||  || — || May 22, 2006 || Kitt Peak || Spacewatch || PAD || align=right | 3.0 km || 
|-id=647 bgcolor=#E9E9E9
| 236647 ||  || — || May 22, 2006 || Kitt Peak || Spacewatch || WIT || align=right | 1.5 km || 
|-id=648 bgcolor=#E9E9E9
| 236648 ||  || — || May 22, 2006 || Kitt Peak || Spacewatch || WIT || align=right | 1.5 km || 
|-id=649 bgcolor=#d6d6d6
| 236649 ||  || — || May 23, 2006 || Kitt Peak || Spacewatch || — || align=right | 5.4 km || 
|-id=650 bgcolor=#E9E9E9
| 236650 ||  || — || May 24, 2006 || Mount Lemmon || Mount Lemmon Survey || — || align=right | 1.7 km || 
|-id=651 bgcolor=#E9E9E9
| 236651 ||  || — || May 25, 2006 || Palomar || NEAT || — || align=right | 2.0 km || 
|-id=652 bgcolor=#E9E9E9
| 236652 ||  || — || May 19, 2006 || Anderson Mesa || LONEOS || — || align=right | 2.6 km || 
|-id=653 bgcolor=#fefefe
| 236653 ||  || — || May 27, 2006 || Catalina || CSS || — || align=right | 1.8 km || 
|-id=654 bgcolor=#E9E9E9
| 236654 ||  || — || May 29, 2006 || Socorro || LINEAR || — || align=right | 3.1 km || 
|-id=655 bgcolor=#E9E9E9
| 236655 ||  || — || May 26, 2006 || Mount Lemmon || Mount Lemmon Survey || — || align=right | 2.3 km || 
|-id=656 bgcolor=#E9E9E9
| 236656 ||  || — || May 19, 2006 || Catalina || CSS || — || align=right | 2.2 km || 
|-id=657 bgcolor=#E9E9E9
| 236657 ||  || — || May 28, 2006 || Siding Spring || SSS || — || align=right | 4.3 km || 
|-id=658 bgcolor=#E9E9E9
| 236658 ||  || — || May 29, 2006 || Kitt Peak || Spacewatch || AGN || align=right | 1.6 km || 
|-id=659 bgcolor=#E9E9E9
| 236659 ||  || — || May 29, 2006 || Kitt Peak || Spacewatch || AGN || align=right | 1.2 km || 
|-id=660 bgcolor=#E9E9E9
| 236660 ||  || — || May 31, 2006 || Mount Lemmon || Mount Lemmon Survey || HOF || align=right | 3.0 km || 
|-id=661 bgcolor=#d6d6d6
| 236661 ||  || — || May 24, 2006 || Anderson Mesa || LONEOS || AEG || align=right | 4.9 km || 
|-id=662 bgcolor=#E9E9E9
| 236662 ||  || — || June 1, 2006 || Reedy Creek || J. Broughton || BRU || align=right | 4.8 km || 
|-id=663 bgcolor=#E9E9E9
| 236663 ||  || — || June 4, 2006 || Socorro || LINEAR || — || align=right | 3.1 km || 
|-id=664 bgcolor=#d6d6d6
| 236664 ||  || — || June 3, 2006 || Mount Lemmon || Mount Lemmon Survey || — || align=right | 5.4 km || 
|-id=665 bgcolor=#E9E9E9
| 236665 ||  || — || June 17, 2006 || Kitt Peak || Spacewatch || — || align=right | 3.1 km || 
|-id=666 bgcolor=#d6d6d6
| 236666 ||  || — || June 18, 2006 || Kitt Peak || Spacewatch || — || align=right | 3.5 km || 
|-id=667 bgcolor=#d6d6d6
| 236667 ||  || — || July 29, 2006 || Reedy Creek || J. Broughton || — || align=right | 3.9 km || 
|-id=668 bgcolor=#d6d6d6
| 236668 || 2006 PJ || — || August 3, 2006 || Pla D'Arguines || R. Ferrando || VER || align=right | 4.2 km || 
|-id=669 bgcolor=#d6d6d6
| 236669 ||  || — || August 14, 2006 || Hibiscus || S. F. Hönig || LIX || align=right | 5.7 km || 
|-id=670 bgcolor=#d6d6d6
| 236670 ||  || — || August 7, 2006 || Siding Spring || SSS || — || align=right | 7.5 km || 
|-id=671 bgcolor=#d6d6d6
| 236671 ||  || — || August 15, 2006 || Siding Spring || SSS || EUP || align=right | 6.9 km || 
|-id=672 bgcolor=#d6d6d6
| 236672 ||  || — || August 12, 2006 || Palomar || NEAT || — || align=right | 4.0 km || 
|-id=673 bgcolor=#d6d6d6
| 236673 ||  || — || August 17, 2006 || Palomar || NEAT || SHU3:2 || align=right | 8.5 km || 
|-id=674 bgcolor=#d6d6d6
| 236674 ||  || — || August 19, 2006 || Kitt Peak || Spacewatch || THM || align=right | 3.1 km || 
|-id=675 bgcolor=#d6d6d6
| 236675 ||  || — || August 19, 2006 || Kitt Peak || Spacewatch || — || align=right | 3.9 km || 
|-id=676 bgcolor=#d6d6d6
| 236676 ||  || — || August 16, 2006 || Siding Spring || SSS || — || align=right | 4.9 km || 
|-id=677 bgcolor=#d6d6d6
| 236677 ||  || — || August 22, 2006 || Palomar || NEAT || HIL3:2 || align=right | 9.4 km || 
|-id=678 bgcolor=#d6d6d6
| 236678 ||  || — || August 19, 2006 || Palomar || NEAT || SYL7:4 || align=right | 8.1 km || 
|-id=679 bgcolor=#d6d6d6
| 236679 ||  || — || August 19, 2006 || Palomar || NEAT || — || align=right | 4.0 km || 
|-id=680 bgcolor=#E9E9E9
| 236680 ||  || — || August 26, 2006 || Socorro || LINEAR || — || align=right | 4.7 km || 
|-id=681 bgcolor=#d6d6d6
| 236681 ||  || — || August 24, 2006 || Socorro || LINEAR || — || align=right | 3.8 km || 
|-id=682 bgcolor=#d6d6d6
| 236682 ||  || — || August 28, 2006 || Socorro || LINEAR || Tj (2.97) || align=right | 6.4 km || 
|-id=683 bgcolor=#E9E9E9
| 236683 Hujingyao ||  ||  || August 28, 2006 || Lulin Observatory || H.-C. Lin, Q.-z. Ye || — || align=right | 5.2 km || 
|-id=684 bgcolor=#d6d6d6
| 236684 ||  || — || August 27, 2006 || Anderson Mesa || LONEOS || LIX || align=right | 3.7 km || 
|-id=685 bgcolor=#E9E9E9
| 236685 ||  || — || September 15, 2006 || Socorro || LINEAR || DOR || align=right | 4.4 km || 
|-id=686 bgcolor=#d6d6d6
| 236686 ||  || — || September 15, 2006 || Kitt Peak || Spacewatch || — || align=right | 2.4 km || 
|-id=687 bgcolor=#d6d6d6
| 236687 ||  || — || September 18, 2006 || Catalina || CSS || — || align=right | 5.9 km || 
|-id=688 bgcolor=#d6d6d6
| 236688 ||  || — || September 16, 2006 || Kitt Peak || Spacewatch || — || align=right | 3.2 km || 
|-id=689 bgcolor=#d6d6d6
| 236689 ||  || — || September 17, 2006 || Catalina || CSS || URS || align=right | 7.4 km || 
|-id=690 bgcolor=#d6d6d6
| 236690 ||  || — || September 25, 2006 || Mount Lemmon || Mount Lemmon Survey || — || align=right | 3.3 km || 
|-id=691 bgcolor=#d6d6d6
| 236691 ||  || — || September 26, 2006 || Kitt Peak || Spacewatch || THM || align=right | 4.5 km || 
|-id=692 bgcolor=#d6d6d6
| 236692 ||  || — || September 19, 2006 || Siding Spring || SSS || ALA || align=right | 6.3 km || 
|-id=693 bgcolor=#d6d6d6
| 236693 ||  || — || October 16, 2006 || Mount Lemmon || Mount Lemmon Survey || HYG || align=right | 3.2 km || 
|-id=694 bgcolor=#d6d6d6
| 236694 ||  || — || October 16, 2006 || Kitt Peak || Spacewatch || THM || align=right | 3.3 km || 
|-id=695 bgcolor=#d6d6d6
| 236695 ||  || — || November 24, 2006 || Catalina || CSS || EUP || align=right | 4.9 km || 
|-id=696 bgcolor=#fefefe
| 236696 ||  || — || February 19, 2007 || Mount Lemmon || Mount Lemmon Survey || — || align=right | 1.0 km || 
|-id=697 bgcolor=#fefefe
| 236697 ||  || — || February 21, 2007 || Mount Lemmon || Mount Lemmon Survey || — || align=right data-sort-value="0.65" | 650 m || 
|-id=698 bgcolor=#fefefe
| 236698 ||  || — || February 21, 2007 || Kitt Peak || Spacewatch || — || align=right data-sort-value="0.64" | 640 m || 
|-id=699 bgcolor=#fefefe
| 236699 ||  || — || March 9, 2007 || Palomar || NEAT || PHO || align=right | 3.0 km || 
|-id=700 bgcolor=#fefefe
| 236700 ||  || — || March 9, 2007 || Palomar || NEAT || — || align=right | 1.1 km || 
|}

236701–236800 

|-bgcolor=#fefefe
| 236701 ||  || — || March 11, 2007 || Mount Lemmon || Mount Lemmon Survey || V || align=right | 3.4 km || 
|-id=702 bgcolor=#fefefe
| 236702 ||  || — || March 9, 2007 || Kitt Peak || Spacewatch || — || align=right data-sort-value="0.94" | 940 m || 
|-id=703 bgcolor=#fefefe
| 236703 ||  || — || March 9, 2007 || Kitt Peak || Spacewatch || — || align=right | 1.0 km || 
|-id=704 bgcolor=#fefefe
| 236704 ||  || — || March 13, 2007 || Mount Lemmon || Mount Lemmon Survey || — || align=right data-sort-value="0.71" | 710 m || 
|-id=705 bgcolor=#fefefe
| 236705 ||  || — || March 14, 2007 || Catalina || CSS || — || align=right | 3.3 km || 
|-id=706 bgcolor=#fefefe
| 236706 ||  || — || March 13, 2007 || Kitt Peak || Spacewatch || — || align=right | 1.5 km || 
|-id=707 bgcolor=#fefefe
| 236707 ||  || — || March 14, 2007 || Kitt Peak || Spacewatch || — || align=right | 1.7 km || 
|-id=708 bgcolor=#fefefe
| 236708 ||  || — || March 15, 2007 || Kitt Peak || Spacewatch || — || align=right data-sort-value="0.88" | 880 m || 
|-id=709 bgcolor=#fefefe
| 236709 ||  || — || March 15, 2007 || Mount Lemmon || Mount Lemmon Survey || — || align=right data-sort-value="0.91" | 910 m || 
|-id=710 bgcolor=#E9E9E9
| 236710 ||  || — || March 14, 2007 || Siding Spring || SSS || EUN || align=right | 3.2 km || 
|-id=711 bgcolor=#fefefe
| 236711 ||  || — || March 16, 2007 || Anderson Mesa || LONEOS || ERI || align=right | 2.4 km || 
|-id=712 bgcolor=#fefefe
| 236712 ||  || — || March 16, 2007 || Mount Lemmon || Mount Lemmon Survey || — || align=right | 1.00 km || 
|-id=713 bgcolor=#fefefe
| 236713 ||  || — || March 16, 2007 || Kitt Peak || Spacewatch || FLO || align=right data-sort-value="0.73" | 730 m || 
|-id=714 bgcolor=#fefefe
| 236714 ||  || — || March 20, 2007 || Kitt Peak || Spacewatch || — || align=right data-sort-value="0.62" | 620 m || 
|-id=715 bgcolor=#fefefe
| 236715 ||  || — || March 20, 2007 || Kitt Peak || Spacewatch || — || align=right data-sort-value="0.68" | 680 m || 
|-id=716 bgcolor=#FFC2E0
| 236716 ||  || — || March 20, 2007 || Catalina || CSS || AMO +1km || align=right data-sort-value="0.93" | 930 m || 
|-id=717 bgcolor=#fefefe
| 236717 ||  || — || April 7, 2007 || Mount Lemmon || Mount Lemmon Survey || — || align=right data-sort-value="0.61" | 610 m || 
|-id=718 bgcolor=#fefefe
| 236718 ||  || — || April 7, 2007 || Mount Lemmon || Mount Lemmon Survey || — || align=right | 1.1 km || 
|-id=719 bgcolor=#fefefe
| 236719 ||  || — || April 11, 2007 || Kitt Peak || Spacewatch || — || align=right data-sort-value="0.78" | 780 m || 
|-id=720 bgcolor=#fefefe
| 236720 ||  || — || April 11, 2007 || Mount Lemmon || Mount Lemmon Survey || NYS || align=right data-sort-value="0.91" | 910 m || 
|-id=721 bgcolor=#fefefe
| 236721 ||  || — || April 11, 2007 || Mount Lemmon || Mount Lemmon Survey || — || align=right data-sort-value="0.77" | 770 m || 
|-id=722 bgcolor=#fefefe
| 236722 ||  || — || April 14, 2007 || Kitt Peak || Spacewatch || — || align=right | 1.1 km || 
|-id=723 bgcolor=#fefefe
| 236723 ||  || — || April 14, 2007 || Kitt Peak || Spacewatch || — || align=right data-sort-value="0.68" | 680 m || 
|-id=724 bgcolor=#fefefe
| 236724 ||  || — || April 14, 2007 || Kitt Peak || Spacewatch || — || align=right data-sort-value="0.87" | 870 m || 
|-id=725 bgcolor=#fefefe
| 236725 ||  || — || April 15, 2007 || Kitt Peak || Spacewatch || — || align=right data-sort-value="0.85" | 850 m || 
|-id=726 bgcolor=#fefefe
| 236726 ||  || — || April 15, 2007 || Mount Lemmon || Mount Lemmon Survey || — || align=right data-sort-value="0.93" | 930 m || 
|-id=727 bgcolor=#E9E9E9
| 236727 ||  || — || April 16, 2007 || Socorro || LINEAR || — || align=right | 2.7 km || 
|-id=728 bgcolor=#d6d6d6
| 236728 Leandri ||  ||  || April 19, 2007 || Saint-Sulpice || B. Christophe || LIX || align=right | 5.4 km || 
|-id=729 bgcolor=#fefefe
| 236729 ||  || — || April 17, 2007 || Anderson Mesa || LONEOS || — || align=right data-sort-value="0.81" | 810 m || 
|-id=730 bgcolor=#fefefe
| 236730 ||  || — || April 18, 2007 || Kitt Peak || Spacewatch || — || align=right data-sort-value="0.76" | 760 m || 
|-id=731 bgcolor=#fefefe
| 236731 ||  || — || April 19, 2007 || Mount Lemmon || Mount Lemmon Survey || — || align=right data-sort-value="0.83" | 830 m || 
|-id=732 bgcolor=#fefefe
| 236732 ||  || — || April 20, 2007 || Kitt Peak || Spacewatch || FLO || align=right data-sort-value="0.73" | 730 m || 
|-id=733 bgcolor=#fefefe
| 236733 ||  || — || April 23, 2007 || Kitt Peak || Spacewatch || FLO || align=right data-sort-value="0.70" | 700 m || 
|-id=734 bgcolor=#fefefe
| 236734 ||  || — || April 22, 2007 || Kitt Peak || Spacewatch || — || align=right data-sort-value="0.68" | 680 m || 
|-id=735 bgcolor=#E9E9E9
| 236735 ||  || — || April 22, 2007 || Kitt Peak || Spacewatch || HOF || align=right | 3.0 km || 
|-id=736 bgcolor=#fefefe
| 236736 ||  || — || May 9, 2007 || Catalina || CSS || — || align=right | 1.2 km || 
|-id=737 bgcolor=#E9E9E9
| 236737 ||  || — || May 8, 2007 || Kitt Peak || Spacewatch || — || align=right | 1.5 km || 
|-id=738 bgcolor=#fefefe
| 236738 ||  || — || May 7, 2007 || Kitt Peak || Spacewatch || — || align=right data-sort-value="0.87" | 870 m || 
|-id=739 bgcolor=#fefefe
| 236739 ||  || — || May 9, 2007 || Mount Lemmon || Mount Lemmon Survey || — || align=right data-sort-value="0.83" | 830 m || 
|-id=740 bgcolor=#fefefe
| 236740 ||  || — || May 9, 2007 || Kitt Peak || Spacewatch || — || align=right data-sort-value="0.97" | 970 m || 
|-id=741 bgcolor=#E9E9E9
| 236741 ||  || — || May 10, 2007 || Mount Lemmon || Mount Lemmon Survey || — || align=right | 4.2 km || 
|-id=742 bgcolor=#fefefe
| 236742 ||  || — || May 12, 2007 || Mount Lemmon || Mount Lemmon Survey || NYS || align=right data-sort-value="0.91" | 910 m || 
|-id=743 bgcolor=#fefefe
| 236743 Zhejiangdaxue ||  ||  || May 7, 2007 || Lulin Observatory || Q.-z. Ye, C.-Y. Shih || — || align=right data-sort-value="0.85" | 850 m || 
|-id=744 bgcolor=#E9E9E9
| 236744 ||  || — || May 14, 2007 || Siding Spring || SSS || — || align=right | 4.0 km || 
|-id=745 bgcolor=#E9E9E9
| 236745 ||  || — || May 25, 2007 || Catalina || CSS || — || align=right | 4.1 km || 
|-id=746 bgcolor=#fefefe
| 236746 Chareslindos ||  ||  || June 8, 2007 || Vallemare Borbon || V. S. Casulli || — || align=right | 1.0 km || 
|-id=747 bgcolor=#fefefe
| 236747 ||  || — || June 8, 2007 || Kitt Peak || Spacewatch || — || align=right data-sort-value="0.89" | 890 m || 
|-id=748 bgcolor=#fefefe
| 236748 ||  || — || June 8, 2007 || Kitt Peak || Spacewatch || FLO || align=right data-sort-value="0.85" | 850 m || 
|-id=749 bgcolor=#E9E9E9
| 236749 ||  || — || June 14, 2007 || Kitt Peak || Spacewatch || — || align=right | 1.8 km || 
|-id=750 bgcolor=#fefefe
| 236750 ||  || — || June 14, 2007 || Kitt Peak || Spacewatch || — || align=right | 1.0 km || 
|-id=751 bgcolor=#E9E9E9
| 236751 ||  || — || June 14, 2007 || Kitt Peak || Spacewatch || MAR || align=right | 2.2 km || 
|-id=752 bgcolor=#d6d6d6
| 236752 ||  || — || June 10, 2007 || Kitt Peak || Spacewatch || — || align=right | 6.0 km || 
|-id=753 bgcolor=#E9E9E9
| 236753 || 2007 MJ || — || June 16, 2007 || Tiki || S. F. Hönig, N. Teamo || — || align=right | 2.3 km || 
|-id=754 bgcolor=#d6d6d6
| 236754 ||  || — || June 16, 2007 || Kitt Peak || Spacewatch || — || align=right | 7.6 km || 
|-id=755 bgcolor=#fefefe
| 236755 ||  || — || June 20, 2007 || Kitt Peak || Spacewatch || — || align=right | 1.0 km || 
|-id=756 bgcolor=#d6d6d6
| 236756 ||  || — || June 21, 2007 || Mount Lemmon || Mount Lemmon Survey || HYG || align=right | 3.2 km || 
|-id=757 bgcolor=#fefefe
| 236757 ||  || — || June 22, 2007 || Kitt Peak || Spacewatch || — || align=right | 1.3 km || 
|-id=758 bgcolor=#d6d6d6
| 236758 ||  || — || July 14, 2007 || Tiki || S. F. Hönig, N. Teamo || ALA || align=right | 4.6 km || 
|-id=759 bgcolor=#E9E9E9
| 236759 ||  || — || July 10, 2007 || Siding Spring || SSS || — || align=right | 1.7 km || 
|-id=760 bgcolor=#E9E9E9
| 236760 ||  || — || July 10, 2007 || Siding Spring || SSS || — || align=right | 3.2 km || 
|-id=761 bgcolor=#E9E9E9
| 236761 ||  || — || July 14, 2007 || Črni Vrh || Črni Vrh || — || align=right | 5.8 km || 
|-id=762 bgcolor=#E9E9E9
| 236762 ||  || — || July 15, 2007 || Siding Spring || SSS || — || align=right | 1.9 km || 
|-id=763 bgcolor=#E9E9E9
| 236763 ||  || — || July 16, 2007 || Socorro || LINEAR || — || align=right | 3.7 km || 
|-id=764 bgcolor=#d6d6d6
| 236764 ||  || — || July 19, 2007 || La Sagra || OAM Obs. || — || align=right | 5.2 km || 
|-id=765 bgcolor=#E9E9E9
| 236765 ||  || — || July 19, 2007 || La Sagra || OAM Obs. || — || align=right | 3.1 km || 
|-id=766 bgcolor=#E9E9E9
| 236766 ||  || — || July 20, 2007 || Reedy Creek || J. Broughton || — || align=right | 1.8 km || 
|-id=767 bgcolor=#fefefe
| 236767 ||  || — || July 21, 2007 || Lulin Observatory || LUSS || ERI || align=right | 3.5 km || 
|-id=768 bgcolor=#E9E9E9
| 236768 ||  || — || July 18, 2007 || Reedy Creek || J. Broughton || — || align=right | 1.1 km || 
|-id=769 bgcolor=#E9E9E9
| 236769 ||  || — || July 21, 2007 || Reedy Creek || J. Broughton || — || align=right | 1.4 km || 
|-id=770 bgcolor=#fefefe
| 236770 ||  || — || July 25, 2007 || Dauban || Chante-Perdrix Obs. || — || align=right | 1.7 km || 
|-id=771 bgcolor=#fefefe
| 236771 ||  || — || August 4, 2007 || Reedy Creek || J. Broughton || MAS || align=right | 1.4 km || 
|-id=772 bgcolor=#E9E9E9
| 236772 ||  || — || August 6, 2007 || Lulin || LUSS || — || align=right | 4.3 km || 
|-id=773 bgcolor=#fefefe
| 236773 ||  || — || August 5, 2007 || Socorro || LINEAR || — || align=right data-sort-value="0.96" | 960 m || 
|-id=774 bgcolor=#fefefe
| 236774 ||  || — || August 5, 2007 || Socorro || LINEAR || MAS || align=right | 1.3 km || 
|-id=775 bgcolor=#d6d6d6
| 236775 ||  || — || August 5, 2007 || Socorro || LINEAR || — || align=right | 6.8 km || 
|-id=776 bgcolor=#fefefe
| 236776 ||  || — || August 9, 2007 || Socorro || LINEAR || MAS || align=right | 1.0 km || 
|-id=777 bgcolor=#E9E9E9
| 236777 ||  || — || August 9, 2007 || Socorro || LINEAR || — || align=right | 3.0 km || 
|-id=778 bgcolor=#E9E9E9
| 236778 ||  || — || August 9, 2007 || Socorro || LINEAR || — || align=right | 3.4 km || 
|-id=779 bgcolor=#E9E9E9
| 236779 ||  || — || August 8, 2007 || Socorro || LINEAR || — || align=right | 1.4 km || 
|-id=780 bgcolor=#E9E9E9
| 236780 ||  || — || August 9, 2007 || Kitt Peak || Spacewatch || — || align=right | 2.5 km || 
|-id=781 bgcolor=#fefefe
| 236781 ||  || — || August 8, 2007 || Socorro || LINEAR || NYS || align=right | 1.1 km || 
|-id=782 bgcolor=#E9E9E9
| 236782 ||  || — || August 8, 2007 || Socorro || LINEAR || — || align=right | 4.8 km || 
|-id=783 bgcolor=#fefefe
| 236783 ||  || — || August 9, 2007 || Socorro || LINEAR || NYS || align=right | 1.1 km || 
|-id=784 bgcolor=#E9E9E9
| 236784 Livorno ||  ||  || August 12, 2007 || San Marcello || L. Tesi, M. Mazzucato || — || align=right | 1.5 km || 
|-id=785 bgcolor=#fefefe
| 236785 Hilendàrski ||  ||  || August 15, 2007 || Zvezdno Obshtestvo || F. Fratev || V || align=right data-sort-value="0.82" | 820 m || 
|-id=786 bgcolor=#d6d6d6
| 236786 ||  || — || August 8, 2007 || Socorro || LINEAR || — || align=right | 4.0 km || 
|-id=787 bgcolor=#d6d6d6
| 236787 ||  || — || August 10, 2007 || Kitt Peak || Spacewatch || — || align=right | 4.0 km || 
|-id=788 bgcolor=#fefefe
| 236788 ||  || — || August 9, 2007 || XuYi || PMO NEO || NYS || align=right | 1.5 km || 
|-id=789 bgcolor=#d6d6d6
| 236789 ||  || — || August 12, 2007 || Socorro || LINEAR || EOS || align=right | 3.1 km || 
|-id=790 bgcolor=#fefefe
| 236790 ||  || — || August 15, 2007 || Socorro || LINEAR || MAS || align=right | 1.4 km || 
|-id=791 bgcolor=#fefefe
| 236791 ||  || — || August 13, 2007 || Socorro || LINEAR || NYS || align=right data-sort-value="0.98" | 980 m || 
|-id=792 bgcolor=#d6d6d6
| 236792 ||  || — || August 9, 2007 || Socorro || LINEAR || — || align=right | 6.3 km || 
|-id=793 bgcolor=#E9E9E9
| 236793 ||  || — || August 6, 2007 || Lulin || LUSS || — || align=right | 2.4 km || 
|-id=794 bgcolor=#fefefe
| 236794 ||  || — || August 9, 2007 || Socorro || LINEAR || — || align=right data-sort-value="0.89" | 890 m || 
|-id=795 bgcolor=#E9E9E9
| 236795 ||  || — || August 9, 2007 || Kitt Peak || Spacewatch || HOF || align=right | 4.4 km || 
|-id=796 bgcolor=#d6d6d6
| 236796 ||  || — || August 13, 2007 || Socorro || LINEAR || URS || align=right | 5.4 km || 
|-id=797 bgcolor=#d6d6d6
| 236797 ||  || — || August 11, 2007 || Socorro || LINEAR || EOS || align=right | 2.7 km || 
|-id=798 bgcolor=#E9E9E9
| 236798 ||  || — || August 12, 2007 || Socorro || LINEAR || — || align=right | 3.2 km || 
|-id=799 bgcolor=#d6d6d6
| 236799 ||  || — || August 10, 2007 || Kitt Peak || Spacewatch || EOS || align=right | 3.0 km || 
|-id=800 bgcolor=#E9E9E9
| 236800 Broder ||  ||  || August 24, 2007 || Wildberg || R. Apitzsch || — || align=right | 3.1 km || 
|}

236801–236900 

|-bgcolor=#fefefe
| 236801 ||  || — || August 16, 2007 || Socorro || LINEAR || NYS || align=right data-sort-value="0.96" | 960 m || 
|-id=802 bgcolor=#d6d6d6
| 236802 ||  || — || August 21, 2007 || Anderson Mesa || LONEOS || EOS || align=right | 2.8 km || 
|-id=803 bgcolor=#d6d6d6
| 236803 ||  || — || August 21, 2007 || Anderson Mesa || LONEOS || HYG || align=right | 5.5 km || 
|-id=804 bgcolor=#d6d6d6
| 236804 ||  || — || August 22, 2007 || Socorro || LINEAR || — || align=right | 3.3 km || 
|-id=805 bgcolor=#d6d6d6
| 236805 ||  || — || August 23, 2007 || Kitt Peak || Spacewatch || KAR || align=right | 1.5 km || 
|-id=806 bgcolor=#d6d6d6
| 236806 ||  || — || September 4, 2007 || Junk Bond || D. Healy || EOS || align=right | 2.7 km || 
|-id=807 bgcolor=#E9E9E9
| 236807 ||  || — || September 2, 2007 || Siding Spring || K. Sárneczky, L. Kiss || HEN || align=right | 1.0 km || 
|-id=808 bgcolor=#E9E9E9
| 236808 ||  || — || September 11, 2007 || Vicques || M. Ory || — || align=right | 2.5 km || 
|-id=809 bgcolor=#E9E9E9
| 236809 ||  || — || September 4, 2007 || La Sagra || OAM Obs. || — || align=right | 2.4 km || 
|-id=810 bgcolor=#d6d6d6
| 236810 Rutten ||  ||  || September 9, 2007 || Wildberg || R. Apitzsch || — || align=right | 6.4 km || 
|-id=811 bgcolor=#d6d6d6
| 236811 Natascharenate ||  ||  || September 12, 2007 || Gaisberg || R. Gierlinger || VER || align=right | 3.4 km || 
|-id=812 bgcolor=#E9E9E9
| 236812 ||  || — || September 14, 2007 || Desert Moon || B. L. Stevens || HOF || align=right | 3.1 km || 
|-id=813 bgcolor=#d6d6d6
| 236813 ||  || — || September 3, 2007 || Catalina || CSS || — || align=right | 5.5 km || 
|-id=814 bgcolor=#d6d6d6
| 236814 ||  || — || September 3, 2007 || Catalina || CSS || THM || align=right | 2.8 km || 
|-id=815 bgcolor=#fefefe
| 236815 ||  || — || September 3, 2007 || Catalina || CSS || NYS || align=right | 1.0 km || 
|-id=816 bgcolor=#d6d6d6
| 236816 ||  || — || September 4, 2007 || Mount Lemmon || Mount Lemmon Survey || KOR || align=right | 1.3 km || 
|-id=817 bgcolor=#d6d6d6
| 236817 ||  || — || September 4, 2007 || Catalina || CSS || TIR || align=right | 5.0 km || 
|-id=818 bgcolor=#fefefe
| 236818 ||  || — || September 5, 2007 || Catalina || CSS || — || align=right | 1.4 km || 
|-id=819 bgcolor=#d6d6d6
| 236819 ||  || — || September 5, 2007 || Anderson Mesa || LONEOS || 3:2 || align=right | 6.5 km || 
|-id=820 bgcolor=#d6d6d6
| 236820 ||  || — || September 5, 2007 || Catalina || CSS || — || align=right | 5.0 km || 
|-id=821 bgcolor=#d6d6d6
| 236821 ||  || — || September 8, 2007 || Anderson Mesa || LONEOS || — || align=right | 4.9 km || 
|-id=822 bgcolor=#d6d6d6
| 236822 ||  || — || September 8, 2007 || Anderson Mesa || LONEOS || 3:2 || align=right | 5.5 km || 
|-id=823 bgcolor=#d6d6d6
| 236823 ||  || — || September 9, 2007 || Kitt Peak || Spacewatch || — || align=right | 5.4 km || 
|-id=824 bgcolor=#E9E9E9
| 236824 ||  || — || September 9, 2007 || Mount Lemmon || Mount Lemmon Survey || PAE || align=right | 3.2 km || 
|-id=825 bgcolor=#E9E9E9
| 236825 ||  || — || September 9, 2007 || Kitt Peak || Spacewatch || — || align=right | 1.9 km || 
|-id=826 bgcolor=#E9E9E9
| 236826 ||  || — || September 9, 2007 || Kitt Peak || Spacewatch || — || align=right | 3.3 km || 
|-id=827 bgcolor=#d6d6d6
| 236827 ||  || — || September 10, 2007 || Kitt Peak || Spacewatch || — || align=right | 3.5 km || 
|-id=828 bgcolor=#E9E9E9
| 236828 ||  || — || September 10, 2007 || Mount Lemmon || Mount Lemmon Survey || HOF || align=right | 3.5 km || 
|-id=829 bgcolor=#d6d6d6
| 236829 ||  || — || September 10, 2007 || Mount Lemmon || Mount Lemmon Survey || CHA || align=right | 2.4 km || 
|-id=830 bgcolor=#d6d6d6
| 236830 ||  || — || September 10, 2007 || Mount Lemmon || Mount Lemmon Survey || — || align=right | 4.8 km || 
|-id=831 bgcolor=#E9E9E9
| 236831 ||  || — || September 10, 2007 || Kitt Peak || Spacewatch || — || align=right | 1.6 km || 
|-id=832 bgcolor=#d6d6d6
| 236832 ||  || — || September 10, 2007 || Mount Lemmon || Mount Lemmon Survey || KOR || align=right | 2.0 km || 
|-id=833 bgcolor=#E9E9E9
| 236833 ||  || — || September 10, 2007 || Mount Lemmon || Mount Lemmon Survey || — || align=right | 1.9 km || 
|-id=834 bgcolor=#d6d6d6
| 236834 ||  || — || September 10, 2007 || Mount Lemmon || Mount Lemmon Survey || KAR || align=right | 1.3 km || 
|-id=835 bgcolor=#E9E9E9
| 236835 ||  || — || September 10, 2007 || Mount Lemmon || Mount Lemmon Survey || — || align=right | 3.4 km || 
|-id=836 bgcolor=#d6d6d6
| 236836 ||  || — || September 10, 2007 || Mount Lemmon || Mount Lemmon Survey || — || align=right | 4.5 km || 
|-id=837 bgcolor=#E9E9E9
| 236837 ||  || — || September 10, 2007 || Mount Lemmon || Mount Lemmon Survey || — || align=right | 3.3 km || 
|-id=838 bgcolor=#d6d6d6
| 236838 ||  || — || September 10, 2007 || Mount Lemmon || Mount Lemmon Survey || — || align=right | 3.1 km || 
|-id=839 bgcolor=#d6d6d6
| 236839 ||  || — || September 10, 2007 || Mount Lemmon || Mount Lemmon Survey || — || align=right | 2.4 km || 
|-id=840 bgcolor=#E9E9E9
| 236840 ||  || — || September 10, 2007 || Kitt Peak || Spacewatch || — || align=right | 2.5 km || 
|-id=841 bgcolor=#d6d6d6
| 236841 ||  || — || September 10, 2007 || Kitt Peak || Spacewatch || VER || align=right | 3.3 km || 
|-id=842 bgcolor=#E9E9E9
| 236842 ||  || — || September 11, 2007 || Kitt Peak || Spacewatch || — || align=right | 2.0 km || 
|-id=843 bgcolor=#d6d6d6
| 236843 ||  || — || September 11, 2007 || Mount Lemmon || Mount Lemmon Survey || — || align=right | 3.7 km || 
|-id=844 bgcolor=#d6d6d6
| 236844 ||  || — || September 11, 2007 || Kitt Peak || Spacewatch || HYG || align=right | 3.6 km || 
|-id=845 bgcolor=#E9E9E9
| 236845 Houxianglin ||  ||  || September 11, 2007 || XuYi || PMO NEO || — || align=right | 2.8 km || 
|-id=846 bgcolor=#fefefe
| 236846 ||  || — || September 12, 2007 || Mount Lemmon || Mount Lemmon Survey || NYS || align=right | 1.0 km || 
|-id=847 bgcolor=#d6d6d6
| 236847 ||  || — || September 14, 2007 || Mount Lemmon || Mount Lemmon Survey || URS || align=right | 4.0 km || 
|-id=848 bgcolor=#E9E9E9
| 236848 ||  || — || September 14, 2007 || Anderson Mesa || LONEOS || — || align=right | 2.0 km || 
|-id=849 bgcolor=#d6d6d6
| 236849 ||  || — || September 14, 2007 || Lulin || LUSS || HYG || align=right | 3.8 km || 
|-id=850 bgcolor=#d6d6d6
| 236850 ||  || — || September 15, 2007 || Lulin || LUSS || — || align=right | 4.0 km || 
|-id=851 bgcolor=#E9E9E9
| 236851 Chenchikwan ||  ||  || September 15, 2007 || Lulin Observatory || C.-S. Lin, Q.-z. Ye || MIS || align=right | 3.3 km || 
|-id=852 bgcolor=#d6d6d6
| 236852 ||  || — || September 13, 2007 || Socorro || LINEAR || SHU3:2 || align=right | 6.8 km || 
|-id=853 bgcolor=#E9E9E9
| 236853 ||  || — || September 13, 2007 || Socorro || LINEAR || — || align=right | 3.4 km || 
|-id=854 bgcolor=#d6d6d6
| 236854 ||  || — || September 14, 2007 || Socorro || LINEAR || — || align=right | 5.1 km || 
|-id=855 bgcolor=#d6d6d6
| 236855 ||  || — || September 14, 2007 || Socorro || LINEAR || HYG || align=right | 3.7 km || 
|-id=856 bgcolor=#d6d6d6
| 236856 ||  || — || September 11, 2007 || Mount Lemmon || Mount Lemmon Survey || SHU3:2 || align=right | 7.2 km || 
|-id=857 bgcolor=#E9E9E9
| 236857 ||  || — || September 12, 2007 || Catalina || CSS || HOF || align=right | 3.3 km || 
|-id=858 bgcolor=#E9E9E9
| 236858 ||  || — || September 11, 2007 || Catalina || CSS || — || align=right | 2.2 km || 
|-id=859 bgcolor=#E9E9E9
| 236859 ||  || — || September 12, 2007 || Mount Lemmon || Mount Lemmon Survey || — || align=right | 2.8 km || 
|-id=860 bgcolor=#E9E9E9
| 236860 ||  || — || September 13, 2007 || Mount Lemmon || Mount Lemmon Survey || KON || align=right | 3.5 km || 
|-id=861 bgcolor=#d6d6d6
| 236861 ||  || — || September 8, 2007 || Bergisch Gladbac || W. Bickel || 3:2 || align=right | 5.5 km || 
|-id=862 bgcolor=#d6d6d6
| 236862 ||  || — || September 10, 2007 || Kitt Peak || Spacewatch || — || align=right | 3.0 km || 
|-id=863 bgcolor=#d6d6d6
| 236863 ||  || — || September 10, 2007 || Mount Lemmon || Mount Lemmon Survey || THM || align=right | 2.8 km || 
|-id=864 bgcolor=#d6d6d6
| 236864 ||  || — || September 10, 2007 || Kitt Peak || Spacewatch || — || align=right | 3.7 km || 
|-id=865 bgcolor=#d6d6d6
| 236865 ||  || — || September 11, 2007 || Kitt Peak || Spacewatch || — || align=right | 2.7 km || 
|-id=866 bgcolor=#d6d6d6
| 236866 ||  || — || September 13, 2007 || Catalina || CSS || EOS || align=right | 3.2 km || 
|-id=867 bgcolor=#d6d6d6
| 236867 ||  || — || September 8, 2007 || Anderson Mesa || LONEOS || HYG || align=right | 4.6 km || 
|-id=868 bgcolor=#E9E9E9
| 236868 ||  || — || September 10, 2007 || Kitt Peak || Spacewatch || — || align=right | 1.1 km || 
|-id=869 bgcolor=#d6d6d6
| 236869 ||  || — || September 10, 2007 || Mount Lemmon || Mount Lemmon Survey || TEL || align=right | 4.5 km || 
|-id=870 bgcolor=#E9E9E9
| 236870 ||  || — || September 14, 2007 || Socorro || LINEAR || EUN || align=right | 1.6 km || 
|-id=871 bgcolor=#fefefe
| 236871 ||  || — || September 15, 2007 || Socorro || LINEAR || NYS || align=right | 1.2 km || 
|-id=872 bgcolor=#E9E9E9
| 236872 ||  || — || September 14, 2007 || Kitt Peak || Spacewatch || GEF || align=right | 1.7 km || 
|-id=873 bgcolor=#d6d6d6
| 236873 ||  || — || September 14, 2007 || Kitt Peak || Spacewatch || — || align=right | 5.0 km || 
|-id=874 bgcolor=#fefefe
| 236874 ||  || — || September 15, 2007 || Anderson Mesa || LONEOS || MAS || align=right | 1.1 km || 
|-id=875 bgcolor=#d6d6d6
| 236875 ||  || — || September 5, 2007 || Catalina || CSS || 7:4 || align=right | 6.2 km || 
|-id=876 bgcolor=#E9E9E9
| 236876 ||  || — || September 11, 2007 || Siding Spring || SSS || — || align=right | 1.9 km || 
|-id=877 bgcolor=#d6d6d6
| 236877 ||  || — || September 13, 2007 || Catalina || CSS || 7:4 || align=right | 6.3 km || 
|-id=878 bgcolor=#C2FFFF
| 236878 ||  || — || September 11, 2007 || Catalina || CSS || L4 || align=right | 13 km || 
|-id=879 bgcolor=#E9E9E9
| 236879 ||  || — || September 14, 2007 || Catalina || CSS || — || align=right | 3.2 km || 
|-id=880 bgcolor=#d6d6d6
| 236880 ||  || — || September 4, 2007 || Mount Lemmon || Mount Lemmon Survey || CHA || align=right | 2.2 km || 
|-id=881 bgcolor=#E9E9E9
| 236881 ||  || — || September 12, 2007 || Catalina || CSS || — || align=right | 1.9 km || 
|-id=882 bgcolor=#E9E9E9
| 236882 ||  || — || September 12, 2007 || Kitt Peak || Spacewatch || — || align=right | 2.6 km || 
|-id=883 bgcolor=#d6d6d6
| 236883 ||  || — || September 14, 2007 || Mount Lemmon || Mount Lemmon Survey || — || align=right | 3.1 km || 
|-id=884 bgcolor=#d6d6d6
| 236884 ||  || — || September 19, 2007 || Dauban || Chante-Perdrix Obs. || HIL3:2 || align=right | 7.2 km || 
|-id=885 bgcolor=#E9E9E9
| 236885 ||  || — || September 16, 2007 || Socorro || LINEAR || MAR || align=right | 1.6 km || 
|-id=886 bgcolor=#d6d6d6
| 236886 ||  || — || September 16, 2007 || Socorro || LINEAR || — || align=right | 6.7 km || 
|-id=887 bgcolor=#E9E9E9
| 236887 ||  || — || September 19, 2007 || Socorro || LINEAR || — || align=right | 2.8 km || 
|-id=888 bgcolor=#d6d6d6
| 236888 ||  || — || September 19, 2007 || Socorro || LINEAR || — || align=right | 5.7 km || 
|-id=889 bgcolor=#d6d6d6
| 236889 ||  || — || September 19, 2007 || Socorro || LINEAR || HYG || align=right | 3.9 km || 
|-id=890 bgcolor=#d6d6d6
| 236890 ||  || — || September 22, 2007 || Črni Vrh || Črni Vrh || — || align=right | 4.1 km || 
|-id=891 bgcolor=#d6d6d6
| 236891 ||  || — || September 18, 2007 || Catalina || CSS || EOS || align=right | 4.5 km || 
|-id=892 bgcolor=#d6d6d6
| 236892 ||  || — || October 7, 2007 || Pla D'Arguines || R. Ferrando || — || align=right | 4.1 km || 
|-id=893 bgcolor=#d6d6d6
| 236893 ||  || — || October 6, 2007 || Socorro || LINEAR || — || align=right | 5.8 km || 
|-id=894 bgcolor=#d6d6d6
| 236894 ||  || — || October 7, 2007 || Altschwendt || W. Ries || 3:2 || align=right | 5.2 km || 
|-id=895 bgcolor=#d6d6d6
| 236895 ||  || — || October 7, 2007 || Calvin-Rehoboth || Calvin–Rehoboth Obs. || URS || align=right | 3.5 km || 
|-id=896 bgcolor=#d6d6d6
| 236896 ||  || — || October 7, 2007 || Calvin-Rehoboth || Calvin–Rehoboth Obs. || VER || align=right | 3.4 km || 
|-id=897 bgcolor=#d6d6d6
| 236897 ||  || — || October 7, 2007 || Dauban || Chante-Perdrix Obs. || — || align=right | 5.1 km || 
|-id=898 bgcolor=#d6d6d6
| 236898 ||  || — || October 9, 2007 || Dauban || Chante-Perdrix Obs. || — || align=right | 4.1 km || 
|-id=899 bgcolor=#d6d6d6
| 236899 ||  || — || October 4, 2007 || Kitt Peak || Spacewatch || — || align=right | 5.5 km || 
|-id=900 bgcolor=#d6d6d6
| 236900 ||  || — || October 4, 2007 || Kitt Peak || Spacewatch || — || align=right | 3.5 km || 
|}

236901–237000 

|-bgcolor=#E9E9E9
| 236901 ||  || — || October 5, 2007 || Siding Spring || SSS || MIT || align=right | 4.0 km || 
|-id=902 bgcolor=#fefefe
| 236902 ||  || — || October 6, 2007 || Kitt Peak || Spacewatch || — || align=right | 1.0 km || 
|-id=903 bgcolor=#d6d6d6
| 236903 ||  || — || October 4, 2007 || Kitt Peak || Spacewatch || — || align=right | 3.8 km || 
|-id=904 bgcolor=#E9E9E9
| 236904 ||  || — || October 4, 2007 || Kitt Peak || Spacewatch || — || align=right | 3.0 km || 
|-id=905 bgcolor=#d6d6d6
| 236905 ||  || — || October 7, 2007 || Mount Lemmon || Mount Lemmon Survey || — || align=right | 3.1 km || 
|-id=906 bgcolor=#d6d6d6
| 236906 ||  || — || October 7, 2007 || Mount Lemmon || Mount Lemmon Survey || — || align=right | 3.7 km || 
|-id=907 bgcolor=#d6d6d6
| 236907 ||  || — || October 8, 2007 || Goodricke-Pigott || R. A. Tucker || — || align=right | 4.0 km || 
|-id=908 bgcolor=#E9E9E9
| 236908 ||  || — || October 5, 2007 || Kitt Peak || Spacewatch || HOF || align=right | 3.3 km || 
|-id=909 bgcolor=#d6d6d6
| 236909 Jakoberwin ||  ||  || October 7, 2007 || Gaisberg || R. Gierlinger || — || align=right | 3.0 km || 
|-id=910 bgcolor=#d6d6d6
| 236910 ||  || — || October 8, 2007 || Anderson Mesa || LONEOS || — || align=right | 4.0 km || 
|-id=911 bgcolor=#d6d6d6
| 236911 ||  || — || October 8, 2007 || Kitt Peak || Spacewatch || — || align=right | 4.9 km || 
|-id=912 bgcolor=#d6d6d6
| 236912 ||  || — || October 7, 2007 || Mount Lemmon || Mount Lemmon Survey || — || align=right | 4.1 km || 
|-id=913 bgcolor=#d6d6d6
| 236913 ||  || — || October 8, 2007 || Catalina || CSS || EMA || align=right | 6.7 km || 
|-id=914 bgcolor=#d6d6d6
| 236914 ||  || — || October 9, 2007 || Lulin || LUSS || — || align=right | 3.3 km || 
|-id=915 bgcolor=#E9E9E9
| 236915 ||  || — || October 6, 2007 || Kitt Peak || Spacewatch || AGN || align=right | 1.8 km || 
|-id=916 bgcolor=#E9E9E9
| 236916 ||  || — || October 6, 2007 || Kitt Peak || Spacewatch || AGN || align=right | 1.7 km || 
|-id=917 bgcolor=#E9E9E9
| 236917 ||  || — || October 8, 2007 || Catalina || CSS || — || align=right | 3.8 km || 
|-id=918 bgcolor=#d6d6d6
| 236918 ||  || — || October 13, 2007 || Dauban || Chante-Perdrix Obs. || — || align=right | 3.4 km || 
|-id=919 bgcolor=#d6d6d6
| 236919 ||  || — || October 6, 2007 || Socorro || LINEAR || THM || align=right | 3.1 km || 
|-id=920 bgcolor=#E9E9E9
| 236920 ||  || — || October 6, 2007 || Socorro || LINEAR || — || align=right | 1.8 km || 
|-id=921 bgcolor=#d6d6d6
| 236921 ||  || — || October 6, 2007 || Socorro || LINEAR || EOS || align=right | 2.8 km || 
|-id=922 bgcolor=#d6d6d6
| 236922 ||  || — || October 9, 2007 || Socorro || LINEAR || EOS || align=right | 3.3 km || 
|-id=923 bgcolor=#d6d6d6
| 236923 ||  || — || October 9, 2007 || Socorro || LINEAR || — || align=right | 4.8 km || 
|-id=924 bgcolor=#E9E9E9
| 236924 ||  || — || October 9, 2007 || Socorro || LINEAR || — || align=right | 3.0 km || 
|-id=925 bgcolor=#d6d6d6
| 236925 ||  || — || October 11, 2007 || Socorro || LINEAR || SHU3:2 || align=right | 7.9 km || 
|-id=926 bgcolor=#E9E9E9
| 236926 ||  || — || October 4, 2007 || Mount Lemmon || Mount Lemmon Survey || ADE || align=right | 3.0 km || 
|-id=927 bgcolor=#d6d6d6
| 236927 ||  || — || October 7, 2007 || Catalina || CSS || — || align=right | 4.4 km || 
|-id=928 bgcolor=#d6d6d6
| 236928 ||  || — || October 7, 2007 || Mount Lemmon || Mount Lemmon Survey || — || align=right | 2.8 km || 
|-id=929 bgcolor=#E9E9E9
| 236929 ||  || — || October 9, 2007 || Mount Lemmon || Mount Lemmon Survey || — || align=right | 2.9 km || 
|-id=930 bgcolor=#E9E9E9
| 236930 ||  || — || October 10, 2007 || Mount Lemmon || Mount Lemmon Survey || MRX || align=right | 1.4 km || 
|-id=931 bgcolor=#E9E9E9
| 236931 ||  || — || October 11, 2007 || Catalina || CSS || — || align=right | 1.8 km || 
|-id=932 bgcolor=#d6d6d6
| 236932 ||  || — || October 6, 2007 || Kitt Peak || Spacewatch || — || align=right | 5.6 km || 
|-id=933 bgcolor=#d6d6d6
| 236933 ||  || — || October 8, 2007 || Mount Lemmon || Mount Lemmon Survey || — || align=right | 4.0 km || 
|-id=934 bgcolor=#d6d6d6
| 236934 ||  || — || October 8, 2007 || Kitt Peak || Spacewatch || — || align=right | 4.2 km || 
|-id=935 bgcolor=#d6d6d6
| 236935 ||  || — || October 8, 2007 || Mount Lemmon || Mount Lemmon Survey || — || align=right | 4.8 km || 
|-id=936 bgcolor=#d6d6d6
| 236936 ||  || — || October 10, 2007 || Kitt Peak || Spacewatch || — || align=right | 3.2 km || 
|-id=937 bgcolor=#d6d6d6
| 236937 ||  || — || October 11, 2007 || Catalina || CSS || — || align=right | 3.9 km || 
|-id=938 bgcolor=#E9E9E9
| 236938 ||  || — || October 7, 2007 || Mount Lemmon || Mount Lemmon Survey || — || align=right | 2.3 km || 
|-id=939 bgcolor=#d6d6d6
| 236939 ||  || — || October 11, 2007 || Catalina || CSS || — || align=right | 5.6 km || 
|-id=940 bgcolor=#E9E9E9
| 236940 ||  || — || October 13, 2007 || Catalina || CSS || WIT || align=right | 1.6 km || 
|-id=941 bgcolor=#E9E9E9
| 236941 ||  || — || October 11, 2007 || Mount Lemmon || Mount Lemmon Survey || ADE || align=right | 2.2 km || 
|-id=942 bgcolor=#d6d6d6
| 236942 ||  || — || October 10, 2007 || Lulin || LUSS || — || align=right | 4.1 km || 
|-id=943 bgcolor=#d6d6d6
| 236943 ||  || — || October 11, 2007 || Kitt Peak || Spacewatch || HYG || align=right | 4.0 km || 
|-id=944 bgcolor=#d6d6d6
| 236944 ||  || — || October 8, 2007 || Mount Lemmon || Mount Lemmon Survey || — || align=right | 3.4 km || 
|-id=945 bgcolor=#d6d6d6
| 236945 ||  || — || October 8, 2007 || Mount Lemmon || Mount Lemmon Survey || — || align=right | 5.6 km || 
|-id=946 bgcolor=#E9E9E9
| 236946 ||  || — || October 9, 2007 || Mount Lemmon || Mount Lemmon Survey || RAF || align=right | 1.2 km || 
|-id=947 bgcolor=#E9E9E9
| 236947 ||  || — || October 15, 2007 || Kitt Peak || Spacewatch || MRX || align=right | 1.4 km || 
|-id=948 bgcolor=#d6d6d6
| 236948 ||  || — || October 15, 2007 || Catalina || CSS || — || align=right | 3.7 km || 
|-id=949 bgcolor=#E9E9E9
| 236949 ||  || — || October 15, 2007 || Kitt Peak || Spacewatch || — || align=right | 2.6 km || 
|-id=950 bgcolor=#E9E9E9
| 236950 ||  || — || October 13, 2007 || Catalina || CSS || — || align=right | 3.3 km || 
|-id=951 bgcolor=#E9E9E9
| 236951 ||  || — || October 10, 2007 || Catalina || CSS || — || align=right | 3.9 km || 
|-id=952 bgcolor=#d6d6d6
| 236952 ||  || — || October 17, 2007 || Anderson Mesa || LONEOS || — || align=right | 4.5 km || 
|-id=953 bgcolor=#d6d6d6
| 236953 ||  || — || October 16, 2007 || Kitt Peak || Spacewatch || URS || align=right | 4.5 km || 
|-id=954 bgcolor=#d6d6d6
| 236954 ||  || — || October 16, 2007 || Kitt Peak || Spacewatch || — || align=right | 3.3 km || 
|-id=955 bgcolor=#d6d6d6
| 236955 ||  || — || October 16, 2007 || Kitt Peak || Spacewatch || — || align=right | 4.6 km || 
|-id=956 bgcolor=#d6d6d6
| 236956 ||  || — || October 16, 2007 || Mount Lemmon || Mount Lemmon Survey || KOR || align=right | 2.1 km || 
|-id=957 bgcolor=#d6d6d6
| 236957 ||  || — || October 17, 2007 || Anderson Mesa || LONEOS || HYG || align=right | 4.0 km || 
|-id=958 bgcolor=#E9E9E9
| 236958 ||  || — || October 20, 2007 || Catalina || CSS || — || align=right | 2.6 km || 
|-id=959 bgcolor=#d6d6d6
| 236959 ||  || — || October 30, 2007 || Mount Lemmon || Mount Lemmon Survey || — || align=right | 3.7 km || 
|-id=960 bgcolor=#d6d6d6
| 236960 ||  || — || October 31, 2007 || Mount Lemmon || Mount Lemmon Survey || — || align=right | 3.3 km || 
|-id=961 bgcolor=#d6d6d6
| 236961 ||  || — || October 30, 2007 || Kitt Peak || Spacewatch || — || align=right | 3.4 km || 
|-id=962 bgcolor=#d6d6d6
| 236962 ||  || — || October 30, 2007 || Kitt Peak || Spacewatch || — || align=right | 3.6 km || 
|-id=963 bgcolor=#E9E9E9
| 236963 ||  || — || October 30, 2007 || Kitt Peak || Spacewatch || — || align=right | 3.9 km || 
|-id=964 bgcolor=#d6d6d6
| 236964 ||  || — || October 31, 2007 || Kitt Peak || Spacewatch || — || align=right | 3.2 km || 
|-id=965 bgcolor=#d6d6d6
| 236965 ||  || — || November 3, 2007 || Kitt Peak || Spacewatch || — || align=right | 3.1 km || 
|-id=966 bgcolor=#d6d6d6
| 236966 ||  || — || November 4, 2007 || Socorro || LINEAR || — || align=right | 5.4 km || 
|-id=967 bgcolor=#d6d6d6
| 236967 ||  || — || November 3, 2007 || Kitt Peak || Spacewatch || — || align=right | 4.4 km || 
|-id=968 bgcolor=#d6d6d6
| 236968 ||  || — || November 7, 2007 || Mount Lemmon || Mount Lemmon Survey || — || align=right | 3.4 km || 
|-id=969 bgcolor=#d6d6d6
| 236969 ||  || — || November 9, 2007 || Kitt Peak || Spacewatch || — || align=right | 3.5 km || 
|-id=970 bgcolor=#d6d6d6
| 236970 ||  || — || December 3, 2007 || Catalina || CSS || VER || align=right | 6.7 km || 
|-id=971 bgcolor=#E9E9E9
| 236971 ||  || — || December 12, 2007 || Great Shefford || P. Birtwhistle || HOF || align=right | 4.4 km || 
|-id=972 bgcolor=#d6d6d6
| 236972 ||  || — || January 5, 2008 || Bisei SG Center || BATTeRS || — || align=right | 7.0 km || 
|-id=973 bgcolor=#d6d6d6
| 236973 ||  || — || February 9, 2008 || Catalina || CSS || 3:2 || align=right | 8.0 km || 
|-id=974 bgcolor=#C2FFFF
| 236974 ||  || — || March 11, 2008 || Kitt Peak || Spacewatch || L5 || align=right | 11 km || 
|-id=975 bgcolor=#E9E9E9
| 236975 ||  || — || April 26, 2008 || Kitt Peak || Spacewatch || — || align=right | 2.9 km || 
|-id=976 bgcolor=#fefefe
| 236976 ||  || — || May 6, 2008 || Dauban || F. Kugel || H || align=right data-sort-value="0.94" | 940 m || 
|-id=977 bgcolor=#d6d6d6
| 236977 ||  || — || July 10, 2008 || Siding Spring || SSS || — || align=right | 6.3 km || 
|-id=978 bgcolor=#FA8072
| 236978 ||  || — || July 27, 2008 || Bisei SG Center || BATTeRS || — || align=right | 1.3 km || 
|-id=979 bgcolor=#fefefe
| 236979 ||  || — || July 29, 2008 || Mount Lemmon || Mount Lemmon Survey || — || align=right | 1.5 km || 
|-id=980 bgcolor=#fefefe
| 236980 ||  || — || July 31, 2008 || La Sagra || OAM Obs. || H || align=right | 1.0 km || 
|-id=981 bgcolor=#fefefe
| 236981 ||  || — || July 27, 2008 || La Sagra || OAM Obs. || FLO || align=right data-sort-value="0.84" | 840 m || 
|-id=982 bgcolor=#E9E9E9
| 236982 ||  || — || July 29, 2008 || La Sagra || OAM Obs. || — || align=right | 3.9 km || 
|-id=983 bgcolor=#E9E9E9
| 236983 ||  || — || July 30, 2008 || Kitt Peak || Spacewatch || — || align=right | 2.7 km || 
|-id=984 bgcolor=#fefefe
| 236984 Astier ||  ||  || August 4, 2008 || Eygalayes Obs. || P. Sogorb || — || align=right data-sort-value="0.96" | 960 m || 
|-id=985 bgcolor=#E9E9E9
| 236985 ||  || — || August 4, 2008 || La Sagra || OAM Obs. || PAD || align=right | 4.2 km || 
|-id=986 bgcolor=#d6d6d6
| 236986 ||  || — || August 26, 2008 || La Sagra || OAM Obs. || LUT || align=right | 5.1 km || 
|-id=987 bgcolor=#fefefe
| 236987 Deustua ||  ||  || August 26, 2008 || La Sagra || OAM Obs. || MAS || align=right data-sort-value="0.99" | 990 m || 
|-id=988 bgcolor=#fefefe
| 236988 Robberto ||  ||  || August 25, 2008 || La Sagra || OAM Obs. || NYS || align=right data-sort-value="0.76" | 760 m || 
|-id=989 bgcolor=#fefefe
| 236989 ||  || — || August 24, 2008 || Socorro || LINEAR || — || align=right | 1.1 km || 
|-id=990 bgcolor=#fefefe
| 236990 ||  || — || August 24, 2008 || Socorro || LINEAR || — || align=right | 1.0 km || 
|-id=991 bgcolor=#E9E9E9
| 236991 ||  || — || September 2, 2008 || Kitt Peak || Spacewatch || — || align=right | 1.4 km || 
|-id=992 bgcolor=#E9E9E9
| 236992 ||  || — || September 3, 2008 || Kitt Peak || Spacewatch || — || align=right | 3.2 km || 
|-id=993 bgcolor=#d6d6d6
| 236993 ||  || — || September 3, 2008 || Kitt Peak || Spacewatch || THM || align=right | 3.3 km || 
|-id=994 bgcolor=#fefefe
| 236994 ||  || — || September 3, 2008 || Kitt Peak || Spacewatch || MAS || align=right data-sort-value="0.88" | 880 m || 
|-id=995 bgcolor=#d6d6d6
| 236995 ||  || — || September 4, 2008 || Kitt Peak || Spacewatch || LIX || align=right | 6.1 km || 
|-id=996 bgcolor=#E9E9E9
| 236996 ||  || — || September 4, 2008 || Socorro || LINEAR || GEF || align=right | 1.6 km || 
|-id=997 bgcolor=#E9E9E9
| 236997 ||  || — || September 5, 2008 || Socorro || LINEAR || ADE || align=right | 4.2 km || 
|-id=998 bgcolor=#fefefe
| 236998 ||  || — || September 2, 2008 || Kitt Peak || Spacewatch || NYS || align=right data-sort-value="0.72" | 720 m || 
|-id=999 bgcolor=#fefefe
| 236999 ||  || — || September 2, 2008 || Kitt Peak || Spacewatch || FLO || align=right data-sort-value="0.65" | 650 m || 
|-id=000 bgcolor=#E9E9E9
| 237000 ||  || — || September 2, 2008 || Kitt Peak || Spacewatch || — || align=right data-sort-value="0.88" | 880 m || 
|}

References

External links 
 Discovery Circumstances: Numbered Minor Planets (235001)–(240000) (IAU Minor Planet Center)

0236